= Stone Cross =

Stone Cross may refer to:

- Stone cross, a type of monument
- The Stone Cross, a novel by Vasyl Stefanyk
- Stone Cross, Crowborough, an area in Crowborough, East Sussex, England
- Stone Cross, Wadhurst, an area in Wadhurst, East Sussex, England
- Stone Cross, Westham, a village in Westham, near Pevensey, East Sussex, England
- Stone Cross, Ashford, a location in Kent district, England
- Stone Cross, Dover, a location in Kent, England
- Stone Cross, Tunbridge Wells, Kent, England
- Stone Cross, West Midlands, an area in the Metropolitan Borough of Sandwell, in the West Midlands, England
