= Stonyford =

Stonyford may refer to:

- Stonyford, California, United States, a census-designated place
- Stoneyford, County Kilkenny, a village in Ireland
- Stonyford, Hampshire, a United Kingdom location

== See also ==
- Stoneyford (disambiguation)
