= List of United Kingdom locations: Sto-St Q =

The United Kingdom

This is part of the list of United Kingdom locations: a gazetteer of place names in the United Kingdom showing each place's locality and geographical coordinates.

== Sto ==
=== Stoa–Stoc ===
Location	Locality	Coordinates (links to map & photo sources)	OS grid reference
Stoak	Cheshire	53.25°N 02.87°W	SJ4273
Stobhill	Northumberland	55.15°N 01.68°W	NZ2084
Stobhillgate	Northumberland	55.15°N 01.68°W	NZ2085
Stobo	Scottish Borders	55.62°N 03.30°W	NT1837
Stoborough	Dorset	50.67°N 02.11°W	SY9286
Stoborough Green	Dorset	50.66°N 02.11°W	SY9285
Stobs Castle	Scottish Borders	55.36°N 02.79°W	NT5008
Stobswood	Northumberland	55.24°N 01.63°W	NZ2394
Stock	Essex	51.66°N 00.42°E	TQ6899
Stock	Lancashire	53.92°N 02.21°W	SD8648
Stock	North Somerset	51.34°N 02.79°W	ST4561
Stockay	Western Isles	57.53°N 07.58°W	NF660628
Stockbridge	Bradford	53.87°N 01.89°W	SE0742
Stockbridge	Doncaster	53.54°N 01.14°W	SE5706
Stockbridge	Hampshire	51.11°N 01.50°W	SU3535
Stockbridge	West Sussex	50.82°N 00.79°W	SU8503
Stockbridge Village	Knowsley	53.43°N 02.87°W	SJ4293
Stockbury	Kent	51.31°N 00.63°E	TQ8461
Stockcross	Berkshire	51.40°N 01.38°W	SU4368
Stockdalewath	Cumbria	54.78°N 02.96°W	NY3844
Stockend	Gloucestershire	51.77°N 02.23°W	SO8409
Stocker's Head	Kent	51.21°N 00.80°E	TQ9650
Stockerston	Leicestershire	52.56°N 00.77°W	SP8397
Stockethill	City of Aberdeen	57.15°N 02.15°W	NJ9107
Stockfield	Birmingham	52.45°N 01.82°W	SP1284
Stock Green	Worcestershire	52.22°N 02.03°W	SO9858
Stockheath	Hampshire	50.85°N 00.99°W	SU7107
Stock Hill	Suffolk	52.28°N 00.88°E	TL9769
Stockholes Turbary	North Lincolnshire	53.55°N 00.85°W	SE7607
Stocking	Herefordshire	51.96°N 02.55°W	SO6230
Stockingford	Warwickshire	52.51°N 01.51°W	SP3391
Stocking Green	Essex	52.01°N 00.31°E	TL5938
Stocking Pelham	Hertfordshire	51.94°N 00.10°E	TL4529
Stockinish Island	Western Isles	57.80°N 06.82°W	NG137899
Stockland	Devon	50.83°N 03.08°W	ST2404
Stockland Bristol	Somerset	51.18°N 03.08°W	ST2443
Stockland Green	Birmingham	52.51°N 01.86°W	SP0991
Stockland Green	Kent	51.15°N 00.22°E	TQ5642
Stockleigh English	Devon	50.84°N 03.63°W	SS8506
Stockleigh Pomeroy	Devon	50.81°N 03.60°W	SS8703
Stockley	Wiltshire	51.40°N 02.00°W	SU0067
Stocklinch	Somerset	50.94°N 02.88°W	ST3817
Stockport	Stockport	53.40°N 02.16°W	SJ8990
Stocksbridge	Sheffield	53.47°N 01.60°W	SK2698
Stocksfield	Northumberland	54.94°N 01.92°W	NZ0561
Stocks Green	Kent	51.20°N 00.21°E	TQ5547
Stockstreet	Essex	51.86°N 00.64°E	TL8222
Stockton	Herefordshire	52.24°N 02.71°W	SO5161
Stockton	Norfolk	52.49°N 01.50°E	TM3894
Stockton (Chirbury with Brompton)	Shropshire	52.60°N 03.09°W	SJ2601
Stockton (Telford and Wrekin)	Shropshire	52.74°N 02.34°W	SJ7716
Stockton (Worfield)	Shropshire	52.58°N 02.41°W	SO7299
Stockton	Warwickshire	52.26°N 01.37°W	SP4363
Stockton	Wiltshire	51.14°N 02.02°W	ST9838
Stockton Brook	Staffordshire	53.06°N 02.13°W	SJ9152
Stockton Heath	Cheshire	53.36°N 02.58°W	SJ6186
Stockton-on-Tees	County Durham and North Yorkshire	54.57°N 01.33°W	NZ4320
Stockton-on-Teme	Worcestershire	52.30°N 02.42°W	SO7167
Stockton-on-the-Forest	York	53.98°N 01.01°W	SE6555
Stocktonwood	Powys	52.60°N 03.09°W	SJ2601
Stockwell	Devon	50.80°N 03.46°W	SS9702
Stockwell	Gloucestershire	51.82°N 02.08°W	SO9414
Stockwell	Lambeth	51.45°N 00.12°W	TQ3075
Stockwell End	Wolverhampton	52.59°N 02.17°W	SJ8800
Stockwell Heath	Staffordshire	52.78°N 01.92°W	SK0521
Stockwitch Cross	Somerset	51.01°N 02.64°W	ST5524
Stockwood	City of Bristol	51.40°N 02.54°W	ST6268
Stockwood	Dorset	50.85°N 02.59°W	ST5806
Stock Wood	Worcestershire	52.22°N 02.00°W	SP0058
Stockwood Vale	Bath and North East Somerset	51.41°N 02.51°W	ST6469

=== Stod–Stom ===
Location	Locality	Coordinates (links to map & photo sources)	OS grid reference
Stodday	Lancashire	54.01°N 02.82°W	SD4658
Stodmarsh	Kent	51.29°N 01.16°E	TR2160
Stody	Norfolk	52.87°N 01.04°E	TG0535
Stoer	Highland	58.19°N 05.35°W	NC0328
Stoford	Somerset	50.91°N 02.62°W	ST5613
Stoford	Wiltshire	51.11°N 01.88°W	SU0835
Stogumber	Somerset	51.12°N 03.30°W	ST0937
Stogursey	Somerset	51.17°N 03.14°W	ST2042
Stoke	Coventry	52.39°N 01.47°W	SP3678
Stoke (Hartland, Torridge)	Devon	50.98°N 04.52°W	SS2324
Stoke (Plymouth suburb)	Devon	50.37°N 04.16°W	SX4655
Stoke (Holne, Dartmoor)	Devon	50.51°N 03.84°W	SX6970
Stoke (Hayling Island)	Hampshire	50.81°N 00.97°W	SU7202
Stoke (Basingstoke and Deane)	Hampshire	51.25°N 01.42°W	SU4051
Stoke	Kent	51.44°N 00.61°E	TQ8275
Stoke	Suffolk	52.04°N 01.14°E	TM1643
Stoke Abbott	Dorset	50.79°N 02.78°W	ST4500
Stoke Albany	Northamptonshire	52.47°N 00.82°W	SP8087
Stoke Aldermoor	Coventry	52.39°N 01.48°W	SP3577
Stoke Ash	Suffolk	52.28°N 01.09°E	TM1170
Stoke Bardolph	Nottinghamshire	52.96°N 01.04°W	SK6441
Stoke Bishop	City of Bristol	51.47°N 02.63°W	ST5675
Stoke Bliss	Worcestershire	52.25°N 02.51°W	SO6562
Stoke Bruerne	Northamptonshire	52.13°N 00.92°W	SP7449
Stoke-by-Clare	Suffolk	52.05°N 00.53°E	TL7443
Stoke-by-Nayland	Suffolk	51.98°N 00.88°E	TL9836
Stoke Canon	Devon	50.77°N 03.51°W	SX9398
Stoke Charity	Hampshire	51.14°N 01.31°W	SU4839
Stoke Climsland	Cornwall	50.54°N 04.31°W	SX3674
Stoke Common	Hampshire	50.97°N 01.33°W	SU4720
Stoke Cross	Herefordshire	52.14°N 02.55°W	SO6250
Stoke D'Abernon	Surrey	51.31°N 00.39°W	TQ1259
Stoke Doyle	Northamptonshire	52.46°N 00.49°W	TL0286
Stoke Dry	Rutland	52.55°N 00.74°W	SP8596
Stoke Edith	Herefordshire	52.05°N 02.58°W	SO6040
Stoke End	Warwickshire	52.57°N 01.75°W	SP1797
Stoke Farthing	Wiltshire	51.02°N 01.93°W	SU0525
Stoke Ferry	Norfolk	52.57°N 00.50°E	TF7000
Stoke Fleming	Devon	50.32°N 03.60°W	SX8648
Stokeford	Dorset	50.68°N 02.19°W	SY8687
Stoke Gabriel	Devon	50.40°N 03.63°W	SX8457
Stoke Gifford	South Gloucestershire	51.51°N 02.54°W	ST6280
Stoke Golding	Leicestershire	52.56°N 01.41°W	SP4097
Stoke Goldington	Milton Keynes	52.12°N 00.78°W	SP8348
Stokegorse	Shropshire	52.44°N 02.64°W	SO5683
Stoke Green	Buckinghamshire	51.52°N 00.58°W	SU9882
Stokeham	Nottinghamshire	53.27°N 00.83°W	SK7876
Stoke Hammond	Buckinghamshire	51.95°N 00.72°W	SP8829
Stoke Heath	Coventry	52.41°N 01.48°W	SP3580
Stoke Heath	Shropshire	52.85°N 02.52°W	SJ6529
Stoke Heath	Worcestershire	52.31°N 02.08°W	SO9468
Stoke Hill	Devon	50.73°N 03.51°W	SX9394
Stoke Hill	Herefordshire	52.13°N 02.57°W	SO6149
Stoke Holy Cross	Norfolk	52.56°N 01.28°E	TG2301
Stokeinteignhead	Devon	50.51°N 03.53°W	SX9170
Stoke Lacy	Herefordshire	52.13°N 02.55°W	SO6249
Stoke Lane	Herefordshire	52.14°N 02.54°W	SO6350
Stoke Lane	Somerset	51.22°N 02.48°W	ST6646
Stoke Lyne	Oxfordshire	51.94°N 01.18°W	SP5628
Stoke Mandeville	Buckinghamshire	51.78°N 00.79°W	SP8310
Stokenchurch	Buckinghamshire	51.65°N 00.90°W	SU7696
Stoke Newington	Hackney	51.55°N 00.08°W	TQ3386
Stokenham	Devon	50.26°N 03.68°W	SX8042
Stoke on Tern	Shropshire	52.83°N 02.53°W	SJ6427
Stoke-on-Trent	City of Stoke-on-Trent	53.02°N 02.19°W	SJ8747
Stoke Orchard	Gloucestershire	51.95°N 02.11°W	SO9228
Stoke Park	Suffolk	52.03°N 01.13°E	TM1542
Stoke Poges	Buckinghamshire	51.53°N 00.58°W	SU9883
Stoke Point	Devon	50.29°N 04.03°W	SX550458
Stoke Pound	Worcestershire	52.30°N 02.06°W	SO9667
Stoke Prior	Herefordshire	52.20°N 02.70°W	SO5256
Stoke Prior	Worcestershire	52.30°N 02.08°W	SO9467
Stoke Rivers	Devon	51.09°N 03.95°W	SS6335
Stoke Rochford	Lincolnshire	52.83°N 00.65°W	SK9127
Stoke Row	Oxfordshire	51.55°N 01.02°W	SU6884
Stokesay	Shropshire	52.42°N 02.83°W	SO4381
Stokesby	Norfolk	52.63°N 01.59°E	TG4310
Stokesley	North Yorkshire	54.46°N 01.19°W	NZ5208
Stoke St Gregory	Somerset	51.03°N 02.94°W	ST3427
Stoke St Mary	Somerset	50.99°N 03.05°W	ST2622
Stoke St Michael	Somerset	51.21°N 02.48°W	ST6646
Stoke St Milborough	Shropshire	52.43°N 02.64°W	SO5682
Stoke sub Hamdon	Somerset	50.95°N 02.75°W	ST4717
Stoke Talmage	Oxfordshire	51.68°N 01.03°W	SU6799
Stoke Trister	Somerset	51.05°N 02.38°W	ST7328
Stoke-upon-Trent	City of Stoke-on-Trent	53.00°N 02.19°W	SJ8745
Stoke Wake	Dorset	50.85°N 02.34°W	ST7606
Stoke Water	Dorset	50.79°N 02.76°W	ST4600
Stoke Wharf	Worcestershire	52.29°N 02.07°W	SO9566
Stokoe	Northumberland	55.16°N 02.42°W	NY7386
St Olaves	Norfolk	52.53°N 01.61°E	TM4599
Stolford	Somerset	51.19°N 03.10°W	ST2345

=== Ston ===
Location	Locality	Coordinates (links to map & photo sources)	OS grid reference
Stondon Massey	Essex	51.67°N 00.28°E	TL5800
Stone	Buckinghamshire	51.80°N 00.87°W	SP7812
Stone	Gloucestershire	51.65°N 02.46°W	ST6895
Stone	Kent	51.44°N 00.25°E	TQ5774
Stone	Rotherham	53.39°N 01.17°W	SK5589
Stone	Somerset	51.10°N 02.60°W	ST5834
Stone	Staffordshire	52.90°N 02.15°W	SJ9034
Stone	Worcestershire	52.37°N 02.22°W	SO8575
Stonea	Cambridgeshire	52.51°N 00.13°E	TL4593
Stoneacton	Shropshire	52.53°N 02.73°W	SO5093
Stone Allerton	Somerset	51.25°N 02.86°W	ST4051
Ston Easton	Somerset	51.27°N 02.54°W	ST6253
Stonebow	Worcestershire	52.13°N 02.10°W	SO9349
Stonebridge	Brent	51.53°N 00.27°W	TQ2083
Stonebridge	Essex	51.55°N 00.75°E	TQ9188
Stonebridge	Norfolk	52.47°N 00.82°E	TL9290
Stonebridge	North Somerset	51.32°N 02.87°W	ST3959
Stonebridge	Solihull	52.43°N 01.69°W	SP2182
Stonebridge	Surrey	51.21°N 00.32°W	TQ1747
Stonebridge Green	Kent	51.19°N 00.73°E	TQ9147
Stonebroom	Derbyshire	53.12°N 01.38°W	SK4159
Stonebyres Holdings	South Lanarkshire	55.66°N 03.86°W	NS8343
Stone Chair	Calderdale	53.73°N 01.83°W	SE1127
Stoneclough	Bolton	53.54°N 02.37°W	SD7505
Stonecombe	Devon	51.16°N 04.00°W	SS6043
Stone Cross (Crowborough)	East Sussex	51.03°N 00.15°E	TQ5128
Stone Cross (Wadhurst)	East Sussex	51.05°N 00.33°E	TQ6431
Stone Cross (Westham)	East Sussex	50.81°N 00.28°E	TQ6104
Stone Cross (Ashford)	Kent	51.08°N 00.88°E	TR0236
Stone Cross (Dover)	Kent	51.26°N 01.32°E	TR3257
Stone Cross (Tunbridge Wells)	Kent	51.12°N 00.17°E	TQ5238
Stone Cross	Sandwell	52.54°N 02.00°W	SP0094
Stonecrouch	Kent	51.07°N 00.41°E	TQ6933
Stonedge	Scottish Borders	55.37°N 02.71°W	NT5509
Stone-edge Batch	North Somerset	51.43°N 02.77°W	ST4671
Stoneferry	City of Kingston upon Hull	53.76°N 00.33°W	TA1031
Stonefield	South Lanarkshire	55.78°N 04.09°W	NS6957
Stonefield	Staffordshire	52.90°N 02.16°W	SJ8934
Stonegate	East Sussex	51.02°N 00.36°E	TQ6628
Stonegate	North Yorkshire	54.47°N 00.81°W	NZ7709
Stonegrave	North Yorkshire	54.18°N 01.00°W	SE6577
Stonegravels	Derbyshire	53.24°N 01.43°W	SK3872
Stonehall	Kent	51.15°N 01.23°E	TR2645
Stonehall	Worcestershire	52.13°N 02.17°W	SO8848
Stonehaugh	Northumberland	55.07°N 02.33°W	NY7976
Stonehaven	Aberdeenshire	56.96°N 02.21°W	NO8786
Stone Head	Lancashire	53.88°N 02.09°W	SD9443
Stone Heath	Staffordshire	52.91°N 02.04°W	SJ9735
Stonehill	Surrey	51.35°N 00.56°W	TQ0063
Stone Hill	Doncaster	53.56°N 00.98°W	SE6708
Stone Hill (Sellindge)	Kent	51.10°N 00.98°E	TR0938
Stone Hill (Egerton)	Kent	51.18°N 00.71°E	TQ9046
Stone Hill	South Gloucestershire	51.43°N 02.51°W	ST6471
Stonehills	Hampshire	50.81°N 01.34°W	SU4602
Stonehouse	Devon	50.36°N 04.16°W	SX4654
Stonehouse	Gloucestershire	51.74°N 02.29°W	SO8005
Stonehouse	South Lanarkshire	55.69°N 03.99°W	NS7546
Stone House	Cumbria	54.26°N 02.35°W	SD7785
Stonehouses	Staffordshire	52.95°N 02.04°W	SJ9740
Stone in Oxney	Kent	51.00°N 00.76°E	TQ9427
Stoneleigh	Surrey	51.36°N 00.24°W	TQ2264
Stoneleigh	Warwickshire	52.34°N 01.51°W	SP3372
Stoneley Green	Cheshire	53.05°N 02.56°W	SJ6251
Stonely	Cambridgeshire	52.29°N 00.38°W	TL1067
Stonepits	Worcestershire	52.20°N 02.00°W	SP0056
Stonequarry	West Sussex	51.13°N 00.00°E	TQ4039
Stone Raise	Cumbria	54.83°N 02.93°W	NY4049
Stoner Hill	Hampshire	51.02°N 00.97°W	SU7225
Stonesby	Leicestershire	52.80°N 00.78°W	SK8224
Stonesfield	Oxfordshire	51.85°N 01.43°W	SP3917
Stones Green	Essex	51.89°N 01.13°E	TM1626
Stone Street	Kent	51.26°N 00.24°E	TQ5754
Stone Street (Babergh)	Suffolk	52.01°N 00.85°E	TL9639
Stone Street (East Suffolk)	Suffolk	52.38°N 01.49°E	TM3882
Stonestreet Green	Kent	51.09°N 00.94°E	TR0637
Stonethwaite	Cumbria	54.50°N 03.14°W	NY2613
Stoneton	Warwickshire	52.18°N 01.32°W	SP4654
Stonewood	Kent	51.42°N 00.28°E	TQ5972
Stoneyard Green	Herefordshire	52.09°N 02.42°W	SO7144
Stoneybank	East Lothian	55.92°N 03.07°W	NT3371
Stoneyburn	West Lothian	55.84°N 03.64°W	NS9762
Stoneycombe	Devon	50.49°N 03.60°W	SX8667
Stoneycroft	Liverpool	53.41°N 02.91°W	SJ3991
Stoney Cross	Hampshire	50.89°N 01.64°W	SU2511
Stoneyfield	Rochdale	53.60°N 02.16°W	SD8912
Stoneyford	Derbyshire	53.03°N 01.34°W	SK4449
Stoneyford	Devon	50.85°N 03.39°W	ST0207
Stoneygate	City of Leicester	52.61°N 01.11°W	SK6002
Stoney Hill	Worcestershire	52.32°N 02.06°W	SO9670
Stoneyhills	Essex	51.63°N 00.81°E	TQ9597
Stoneykirk	Dumfries and Galloway	54.83°N 04.99°W	NX0853
Stoneylane	Shropshire	52.38°N 02.66°W	SO5576
Stoney Middleton	Derbyshire	53.27°N 01.67°W	SK2275
Stoney Royd	Calderdale	53.71°N 01.86°W	SE0924
Stoney Stanton	Leicestershire	52.54°N 01.27°W	SP4994
Stoney Stoke	Somerset	51.08°N 02.42°W	ST7032
Stoney Stratton	Somerset	51.14°N 02.50°W	ST6539
Stoney Stretton	Shropshire	52.67°N 02.91°W	SJ3809
Stoneywood	City of Aberdeen	57.19°N 02.18°W	NJ8911
Stoneywood	Falkirk	56.01°N 03.94°W	NS7982
Stonganess	Shetland Islands	60.69°N 01.01°W	HP5402
Stonham Aspal	Suffolk	52.18°N 01.11°E	TM1359
Stonnall	Staffordshire	52.62°N 01.89°W	SK0703
Stonor	Oxfordshire	51.58°N 00.94°W	SU7388
Stonton Wyville	Leicestershire	52.54°N 00.92°W	SP7395
Stony Batter	Hampshire	51.05°N 01.60°W	SU2829
Stonybreck	Shetland Islands	59.51°N 01.64°W	HZ2070
Stony Cross	Devon	51.00°N 04.12°W	SS5125
Stony Cross (near Marden)	Herefordshire	52.12°N 02.41°W	SO5247
Stony Cross (near Brimfield)	Herefordshire	52.29°N 02.67°W	SO5466
Stony Cross (near Westfield)	Herefordshire	52.12°N 02.41°W	SO7247
Stony Dale	Nottinghamshire	52.98°N 00.92°W	SK7244
Stonyford	Hampshire	50.93°N 01.54°W	SU3215
Stony Gate	Sunderland	54.85°N 01.45°W	NZ3551
Stony Green	Buckinghamshire	51.68°N 00.75°W	SU8699
Stony Heap	Durham	54.85°N 01.78°W	NZ1451
Stony Heath	Hampshire	51.31°N 01.18°W	SU5758
Stony Houghton	Derbyshire	53.18°N 01.26°W	SK4966
Stony Knaps	Dorset	50.83°N 02.86°W	ST3904
Stonyland	Devon	51.04°N 04.09°W	SS5329
Stony Littleton	Bath and North East Somerset	51.30°N 02.38°W	ST7356
Stonymarsh	Hampshire	51.03°N 01.53°W	SU3326
Stony Stratford	Milton Keynes	52.05°N 00.84°W	SP7940

=== Stoo–Stoz ===
Location	Locality	Coordinates (links to map & photo sources)	OS grid reference
Stoodleigh	Devon	50.95°N 03.53°W	SS9218
Stop-and-Call	Pembrokeshire	52.00°N 05.01°W	SM9338
Stopes	Sheffield	53.38°N 01.58°W	SK2888
Stopgate	Devon	50.87°N 03.09°W	ST2309
Stopham	West Sussex	50.96°N 00.54°W	TQ0219
Stopper Lane	Lancashire	53.90°N 02.29°W	SD8145
Stopsley	Luton	51.89°N 00.40°W	TL1023
Stoptide	Cornwall	50.53°N 04.90°W	SW9475
Storeton	Wirral	53.34°N 03.05°W	SJ3084
Storiths	North Yorkshire	53.98°N 01.87°W	SE0854
Stormontfield	Perth and Kinross	56.44°N 03.46°W	NO1029
Stormore	Wiltshire	51.24°N 02.23°W	ST8449
Stornoway	Western Isles	58.20°N 06.39°W	NB4232
Storridge	Herefordshire	52.13°N 02.36°W	SO7548
Storrington	West Sussex	50.91°N 00.46°W	TQ0814
Storrs	Cumbria	54.33°N 02.93°W	SD3994
Storrs	Sheffield	53.39°N 01.56°W	SK2989
Storth	Cumbria	54.20°N 02.81°W	SD4779
Storwood	East Riding of Yorkshire	53.88°N 00.92°W	SE7144
St Osyth	Essex	51.79°N 01.07°E	TM1215
St Osyth Heath	Essex	51.82°N 01.08°E	TM1318
Stotfield	Moray	57.71°N 03.31°W	NJ2270
Stotfold	Bedfordshire	52.00°N 00.23°W	TL2136
Stottesdon	Shropshire	52.43°N 02.48°W	SO6782
Stoughton	Leicestershire	52.61°N 01.05°W	SK6402
Stoughton	Surrey	51.24°N 00.59°W	SU9851
Stoughton	West Sussex	50.89°N 00.86°W	SU8011
Stoughton Cross	Somerset	51.23°N 02.83°W	ST4249
Stoulton	Worcestershire	52.13°N 02.14°W	SO9049
Stourbridge	Dudley	52.44°N 02.17°W	SO8883
Stourpaine	Dorset	50.88°N 02.20°W	ST8609
Stourport-on-Severn	Worcestershire	52.33°N 02.28°W	SO8171
Stour Provost	Dorset	50.98°N 02.30°W	ST7921
Stour Row	Dorset	50.98°N 02.25°W	ST8221
Stourton	City of Leeds	53.76°N 01.51°W	SE3230
Stourton	Staffordshire	52.46°N 02.20°W	SO8685
Stourton	Warwickshire	52.02°N 01.57°W	SP2936
Stourton	Wiltshire	51.10°N 02.32°W	ST7734
Stourton Caundle	Dorset	50.93°N 02.41°W	ST7115
Stourton Hill	Warwickshire	52.01°N 01.56°W	SP3035
Stout	Somerset	51.07°N 02.81°W	ST4331
Stove (Mainland)	Shetland Islands	59.99°N 01.24°W	HU4224
Stove (Unst)	Shetland Islands	60.78°N 00.86°W	HP6212
Stoven	Suffolk	52.37°N 01.58°E	TM4481
Stow	Lincolnshire	53.31°N 00.68°W	SK8881
Stow (Stow of Wedale)	Scottish Borders	55.68°N 02.86°W	NT4644
Stow Bardolph	Norfolk	52.61°N 00.39°E	TF6205
Stow Bedon	Norfolk	52.52°N 00.87°E	TL9596
Stowbridge	Norfolk	52.63°N 00.36°E	TF6007
Stow cum Quy	Cambridgeshire	52.21°N 00.22°E	TL5260
Stowe	Gloucestershire	51.75°N 02.63°W	SO5606
Stowe	Herefordshire	52.11°N 03.05°W	SO2847
Stowe	Shropshire	52.35°N 03.01°W	SO3173
Stowe	Staffordshire	52.68°N 01.82°W	SK1210
Stowe-by-Chartley	Staffordshire	52.84°N 02.00°W	SK0027
Stowe Green	Gloucestershire	51.75°N 02.63°W	SO5606
Stowell	Gloucestershire	51.81°N 01.88°W	SP0813
Stowell	Somerset	50.99°N 02.45°W	ST6822
St Owen's Cross	Herefordshire	51.91°N 02.68°W	SO5324
Stowey	Bath and North East Somerset	51.32°N 02.58°W	ST5959
Stowfield	Gloucestershire	51.85°N 02.59°W	SO5917
Stowford (Bratton Fleming)	Devon	51.15°N 03.93°W	SS6541
Stowford (Chittlehampton)	Devon	51.01°N 03.96°W	SS6226
Stowford (Bradworthy)	Devon	50.89°N 04.43°W	SS2913
Stowford (Halwill)	Devon	50.75°N 04.22°W	SX4397
Stowford (Sidmouth)	Devon	50.69°N 03.26°W	SY1189
Stowford (West Devon)	Devon	50.65°N 04.22°W	SX4386
Stowford Water	Devon	50.86°N 03.32°W	ST0708
Stowgate	Lincolnshire	52.67°N 00.24°W	TF1910
Stowlangtoft	Suffolk	52.27°N 00.85°E	TL9568
Stowlawn	Wolverhampton	52.57°N 02.08°W	SO9497
Stow Longa	Cambridgeshire	52.31°N 00.38°W	TL1070
Stow Maries	Essex	51.66°N 00.64°E	TQ8399
Stowmarket	Suffolk	52.18°N 00.99°E	TM0558
Stow-on-the-Wold	Gloucestershire	51.92°N 01.72°W	SP1925
Stow Park	City of Newport	51.57°N 03.01°W	ST3087
Stowting	Kent	51.12°N 01.02°E	TR1241
Stowting Common	Kent	51.14°N 01.02°E	TR1243
Stowting Court	Kent	51.12°N 01.01°E	TR1141
Stowupland	Suffolk	52.20°N 01.01°E	TM0660

== St P – St Q ==
Location	Locality	Coordinates (links to map & photo sources)	OS grid reference
St Pancras	Camden	51.52°N 00.12°W	TQ3082
St Paul's	City of Bristol	51.85°N 02.26°W	SO8217
St Paul's Cray	Bromley	51.40°N 00.09°E	TQ4669
St Paul's Walden	Hertfordshire	51.88°N 00.27°W	TL1922
St Peter's	Newcastle upon Tyne	54.96°N 01.57°W	NZ2763
St Peter's	Gloucestershire	51.90°N 02.10°W	SO9323
St Peter's	Kent	51.36°N 01.41°E	TR3868
St Peter South Elmham	Suffolk	52.40°N 01.42°E	TM3384
St Peter the Great	Worcestershire	52.16°N 02.22°W	SO8552
St Petrox	Pembrokeshire	51.63°N 04.93°W	SR9797
St Pinnock	Cornwall	50.43°N 04.53°W	SX2063
St Quivox	South Ayrshire	55.48°N 04.58°W	NS3724
