= Sibhinis =

Tidal island of the Monach Islands, lying between Ceann Iar and Deann Ear

Coordinates: 57°31′20″N 7°38′05″W

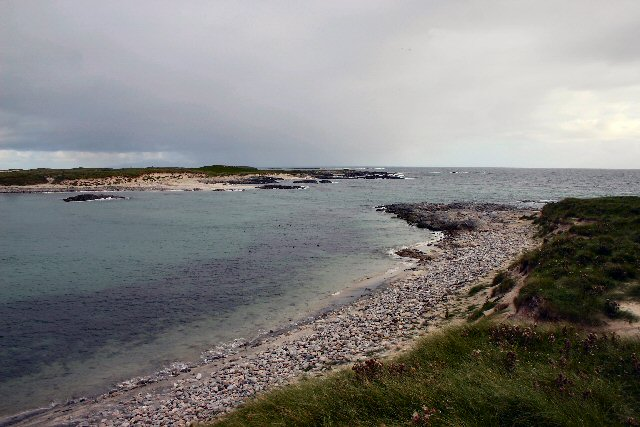
Sibhinis from Ceann Iar

Sibhinis, Siobhanais or Shivinish. is one of the Monach Islands, lying between Ceann Iar to the west and Ceann Ear to the east. It is tidal, and connected at low tide to Ceann Iar by Fadhail Shibhinis, and to Ceann Ear by Faodhail Chinn Ear. It is 16 metres (52 feet) at its highest point. It is said that it was at one time possible to walk all the way to Baleshare, and on to North Uist, five miles (8 km) away at low tide. In the 16th century, a large tidal wave was said to have washed this away.

The island is about 22 hectares (54 acres) acres in extent.

== See also ==
- List of islands of Scotland
