= Row Heath =

Hamlet in Essex, England

Coordinates: 51.834°N 1.12°E

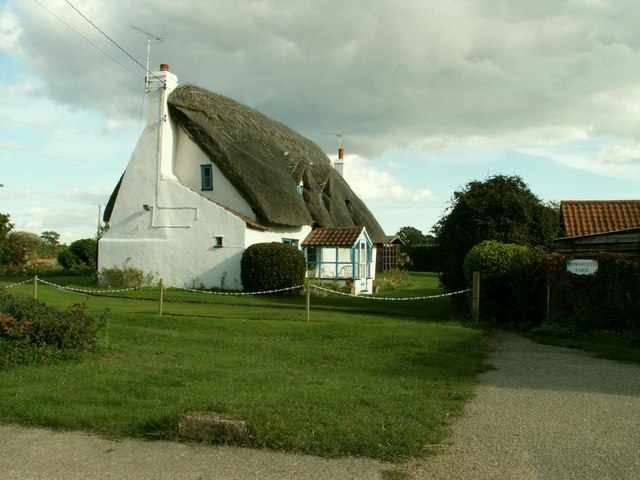

- Location within Essex
- Civil parish: St Osyth
- District: Tendring
- Shire county: Essex
- Region: East
- Country: England
- Sovereign state: United Kingdom
- Police: Essex
- Fire: Essex
- Ambulance: East of England

Row Heath is a hamlet on Rectory Road, in the civil parish of St Osyth, in the Tendring district, in the county of Essex, England. The hamlet is near the A133 road between Weeley Heath and St Osyth Heath.
