= Ceann Iar =

Tidal island in the Monach Isles, Scotland

Ceann Iar (Gaelic)

Location
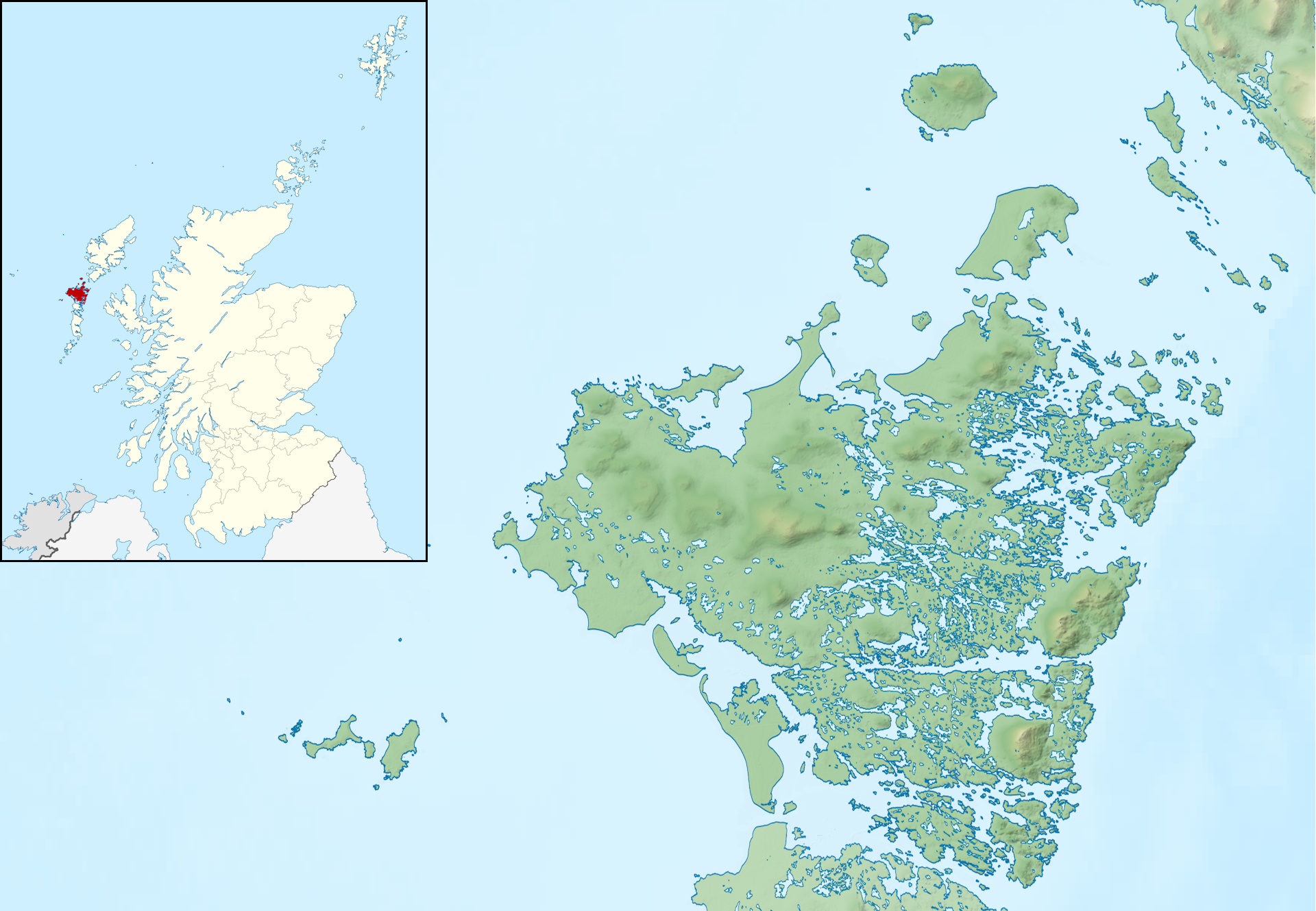
- Ceann Iar shown next to North Uist Ceann Iar shown within the Outer Hebrides
- OS grid reference: NF616623
- Coordinates: 57.52°N 7.65°W

Name
- Name meaning: Western Headland

Physical geography
- Island group: Monach Islands
- Area: 154 ha (380 acres)
- Area rank: 122
- Highest elevation: Cnoc Bharr 19 m

Administration
- Council area: Comhairle nan Eilean Siar
- Country: Scotland
- Sovereign state: United Kingdom

Demographics
- Population: 0

Ceann Iar (Gaelic "Western Headland") is one of the Monach Isles/Heisgeir, to the west of North Uist in the Outer Hebrides. It is a slender island, approximately a mile, or two kilometres long.

== Geography ==
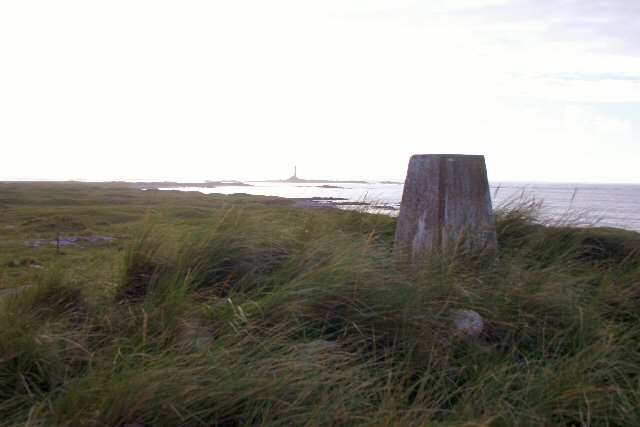
Cnoc Bhàrr is the highest point of the Monach Islands, at a mere 19 metres. Siolaigh/Shillay can be seen in the distance

Ceann Iar is the second largest of the Monach Islands. It is connected at low tide to Ceann Ear via Sibhinis. It is said that it was at one time possible to walk all the way to Baleshare, and on to North Uist, five miles away, at low tide. In the 16th century, a large tidal wave was said to have washed this away. Despite Ceann Iar's name, Shillay is in fact the westernmost of the group.

Like the other islands of the group, it is a low-lying, sandy island, subject to intense coastal erosion. Not unlike the Isles of Scilly, it is possible that Ceann Iar, Sibhinis and Ceann Ear formed a single body of land within historic times, and that their land area has greatly decreased due to overgrazing, and wind erosion as well.

On the east side is Baile Beag (little town), the settlement of the island, on the slopes of Cnoc Bhàrr (top hill), which at 19 metres in height is a mere metre higher than neighbouring Ceann Ear's hillocks. In the north, there is also Cnoc Mòr (big hill), which is the other "height" on the island. The west is formed by Rubha Shulabhaig (a headland), and the north east by Hearnish. Just to the north is the island of S(t)ròmaigh (from Old Norse meaning "storm island")

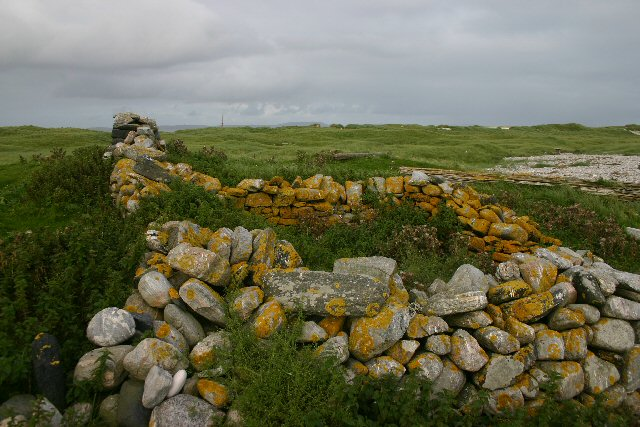
Ruins on Ceann Iar

== History ==
A cairn on Ceann Iar marks the grave of Lieutenant RNR MacNeill of the HMA Laurentic. The ship hit a mine in 1917, during World War I, off Northern Ireland, and his body had drifted all the way to here. Strangely, this accords with the old Hebridean tradition that the sea carries the drowned home - the Monachs are Clan MacNeil territory.

The island had been settled intermittently for over a thousand years, although the main settlement was on Ceann Ear. It was resettled in the wake of the Highland Clearances, but finally abandoned in 1942.
