= Stocaigh =

Location
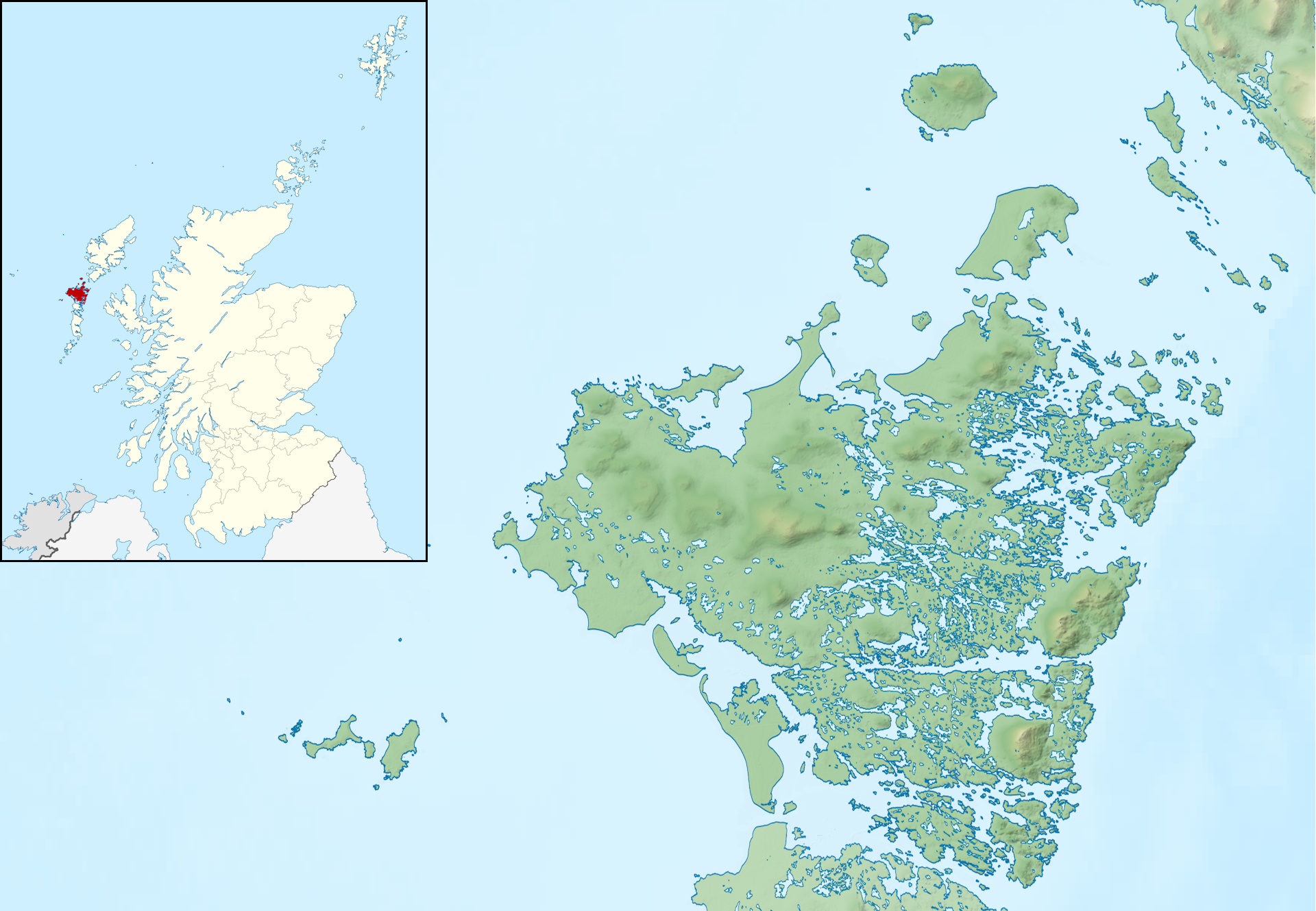
- Stocaigh shown next to North Uist Stocaigh shown within the Outer Hebrides
- OS grid reference: NF660630
- Coordinates: 57.53°N 7.58°W

Name
- Name meaning: "Chasm island", from Norse
- Old Norse name: Stok-ey

Physical geography
- Island group: Monach Islands
- Area: <40 ha
- Highest elevation: m

Administration
- Council area: Comhairle nan Eilean Siar
- Country: Scotland
- Sovereign state: United Kingdom

Demographics
- Population: 0

Stocaigh (Stockay) is one of the Monach Islands. It is a kilometre east of Coilleag Mhòr nan Dàmh in the far north east of Ceann Ear. On its east shore is the Camas Bàn, which is named for its white sand, which consists of finely ground sea shells.
