= Ceann Ear =

Largest island in the Monach or Heisgeir group off North Uist in north west Scotland

Ceann Ear (Gaelic)

Location
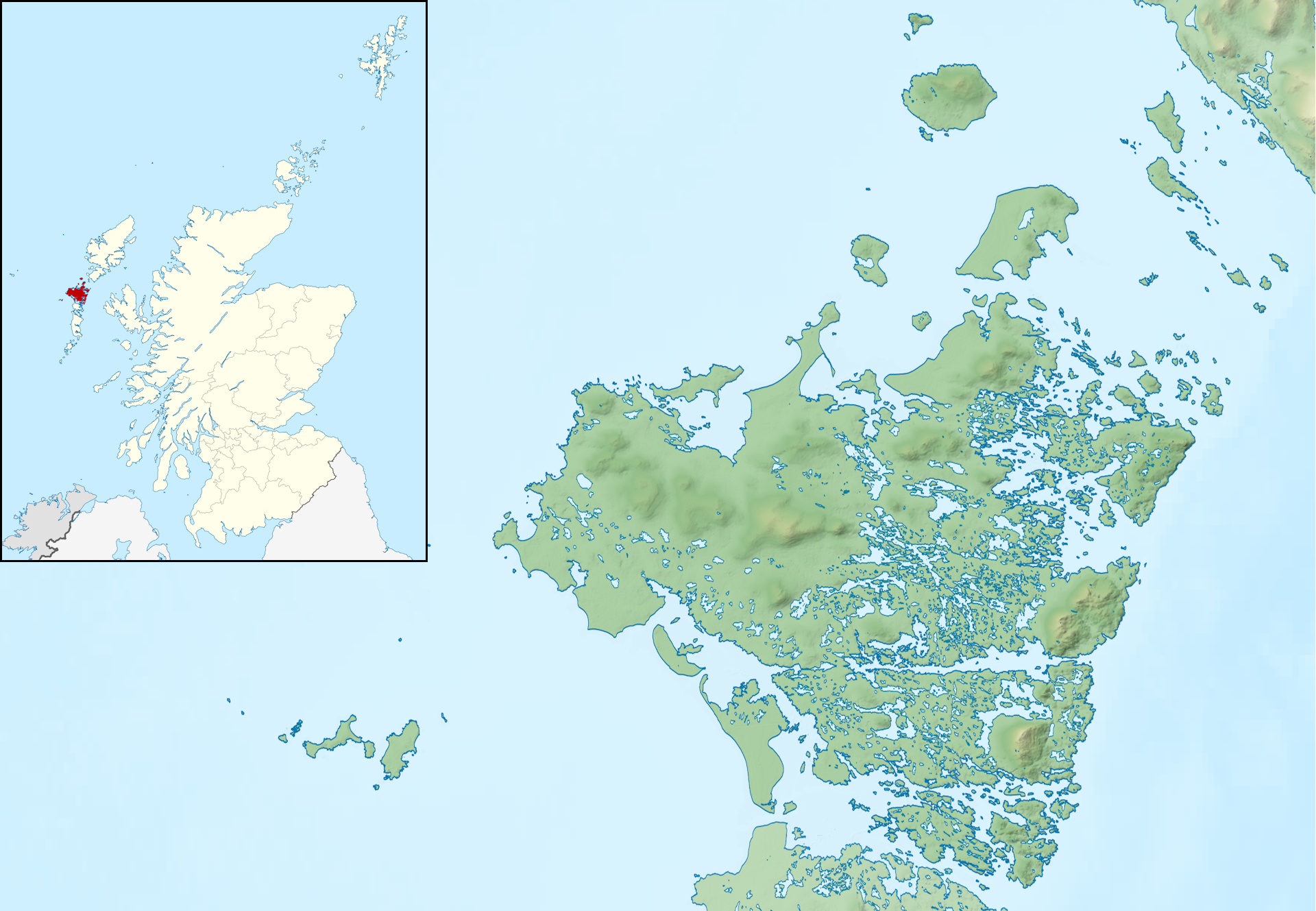
- Ceann Ear shown next to North Uist Ceann Ear within the Outer Hebrides
- OS grid reference: NF640619
- Coordinates: 57.52°N 7.61°W

Name
- Name meaning: Eastern Headland

Physical geography
- Island group: Monach Islands
- Area: 203 ha (3/4 sq mi)
- Area rank: 108
- Highest elevation: 17 m (56 ft)

Administration
- Council area: Comhairle nan Eilean Siar
- Country: Scotland
- Sovereign state: United Kingdom

Demographics
- Population: 0

Disambiguation: "Ceann Ear" is a common Scottish placename meaning Eastern Headland

Ceann Ear is the largest island in the Monach or Heisgeir group off North Uist in north west Scotland. It is 203 hectares (500 acres) in size. It is the most easterly of the three main Monach Islands, and connected by sandbanks to Ceann Iar via Sibhinis at low tide. It is said that it was at one time possible to walk all the way to Baleshare, and on to North Uist, 5 miles (8 kilometres) away at low tide. In the 16th century, a large tidal wave was said to have washed this away.

Today the islands are a national nature reserve.

== Human settlement ==
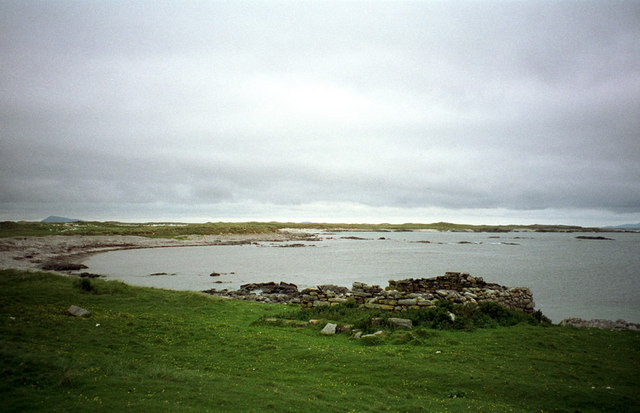
Ruin once used by lobster fishermen at Port Ruadh as a bothy

Ceann Ear had been settled for at least a thousand years, before being finally abandoned. Like the other Monach Islands, it was originally abandoned due to overgrazing, and resettled in the wake of the Highland Clearances.

In the 13th century, a chapel was established, which had links to Iona. This monastery was probably at Cladh na Beide in the north east. The monks were responsible for maintaining a light on nearby Shillay to warn ships. Ceann Ear was also known as "Heisgeir nan Cailleach" ("Heisker of the Nuns") due to a nunnery which may have been established in the 13th century. (Cailleach is usually translated as "old woman", but originally meant a nun.)

Unusually, the islanders had their grain drying kilns inside their houses. This is not common at all in the Hebrides, but more a feature of Shetland.

There are still the remains of the village in the south of the island, and the old schoolhouse is upkept as a fisherman's shelter. There was formerly a post office and a school here, but no shops.

== Geography ==
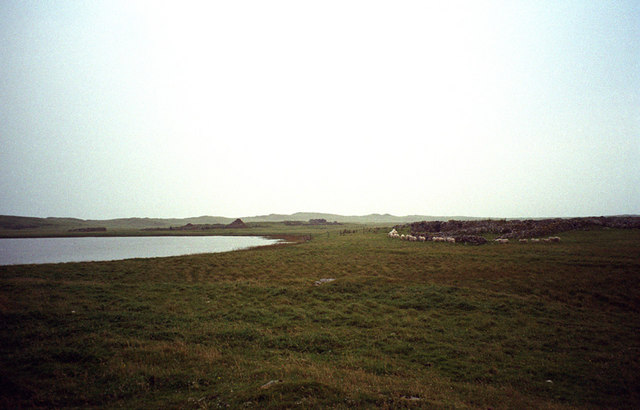
Loch nam Buadh, with the ruins of the village in the distance

A low lying, sandy island, subject to intense coastal erosion. The highest point is Coilleag Mhòr nan Dàmh at Gortinish at the north east of the island.

Gale-force winds blast the Monach Isles on about 160 days of the year. Only certain plants, such as marram grass, can withstand the constant blown sand and salt spray. Farther inland, there are more permanent patches of damp grassland, the wettest having rushes and moss. There are only a few tiny lochs, all rather salty and some only seasonal. The remains of the little village of Ceann Ear are clustered around the largest one (Loch nam Buadh), but the villagers used to get their freshwater from a few wells nearby.

== See also ==
- List of islands of Scotland
