= Stone Cross, Tunbridge Wells =

Hamlet in Kent, England

Coordinates: 51°07′47″N 0°10′27″E

The placename Stone Cross occurs in several parts of England, including two other smaller places in Kent: one near Sandwich, and one southeast of Ashford.

Stone Cross is a hamlet in the civil parish of Speldhurst, in the Tunbridge Wells district, in the county of Kent, England. It is on the A264 road east of Ashurst. There are few houses and no shops. Burrswood, a building designed by Decimus Burton is located between the hamlet and Groombridge it in commercial use by a Christian charity.
