= Stoneyford =

Stoneyford may refer to:

- Stoneyford, County Antrim, Northern Ireland, a village
- Stoneyford, County Kilkenny, Ireland, a small town
- Stoneyford, Derbyshire, England, a hamlet
- Stoneyford, Devon, England; see List of United Kingdom locations: Sto-St Q § Ston

== See also ==
- Stonyford, California, United States, a census-designated place
