= Shillay, Monach Islands =

Shillay
Siolaigh/Seilaigh (Gaelic)

Location
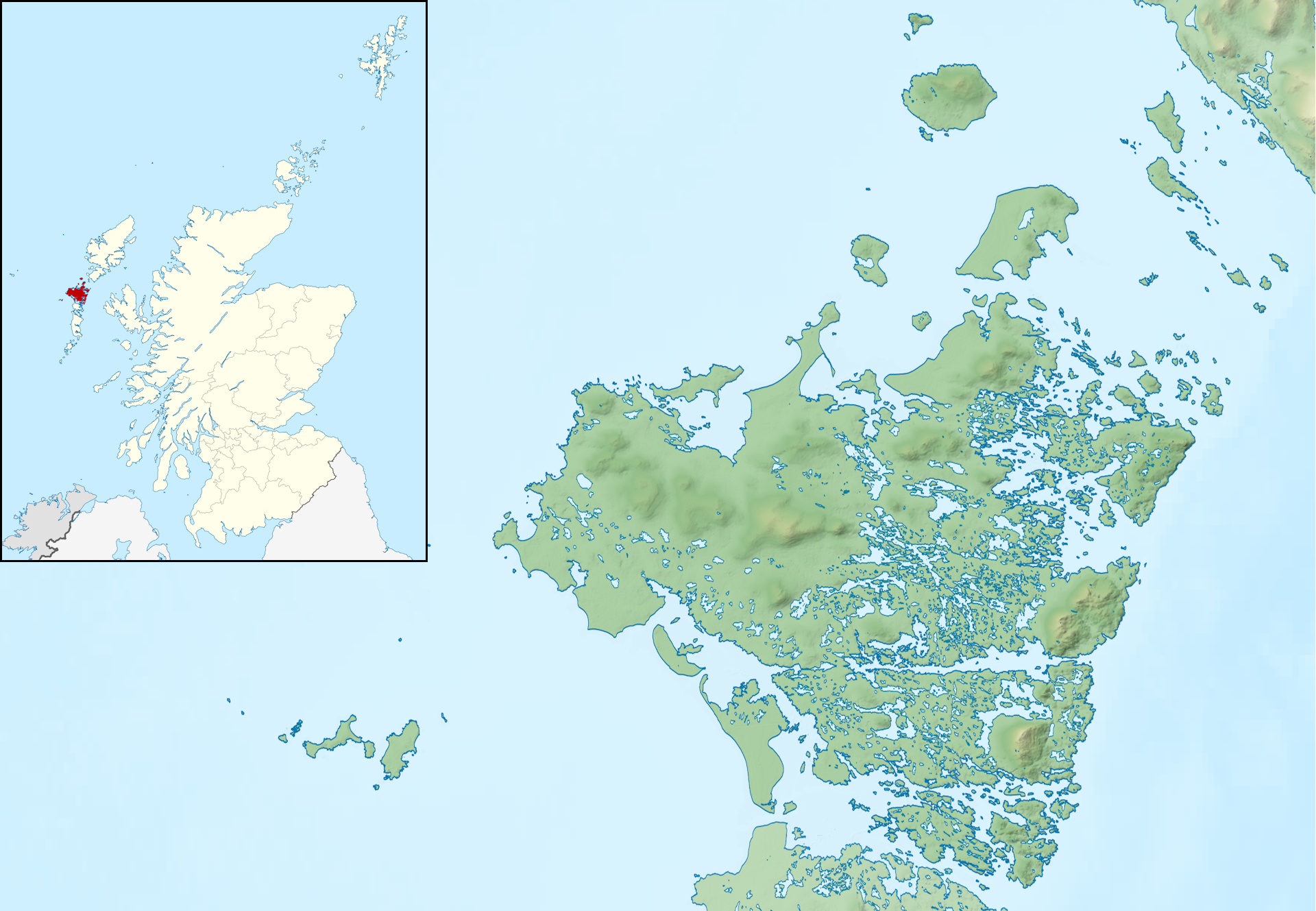
- Shillay shown next to North Uist Shillay shown within the Outer Hebrides
- OS grid reference: NF593628
- Coordinates: 57.53°N 7.69°W

Name
- Name meaning: Seal Island or "Herring island", from Norse
- Old Norse name: Selrey

Physical geography
- Island group: Monach Islands
- Area: 7.4 ha (18 acres)
- Highest elevation: 10 m (33 ft)

Administration
- Council area: Comhairle nan Eilean Siar
- Country: Scotland
- Sovereign state: United Kingdom

Demographics
- Population: 0

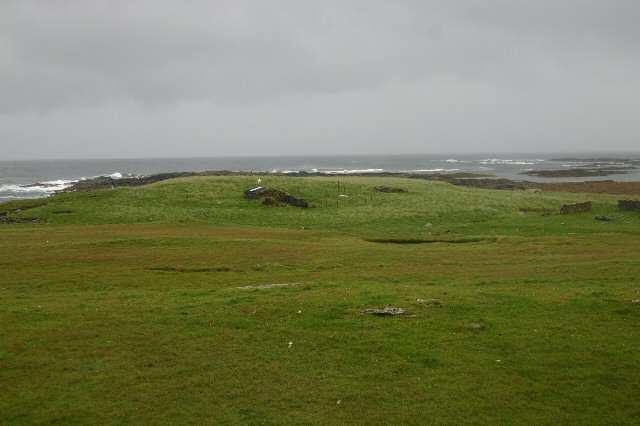
A ruined cottage, now replaced with a Portakabin, used until recently as a fisherman's shelter

Shillay Lighthouse Siolaigh Monach Isles
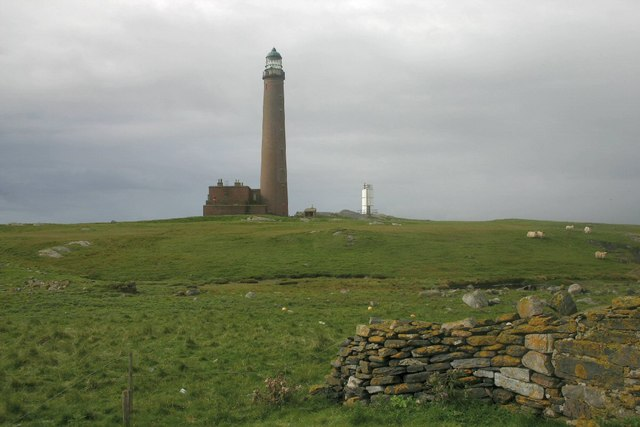
- The old lighthouse was not used between 1942 and 2008
- Location: Shillay Isle; Monach Islands; Outer Hebrides; Scotland; United Kingdom
- OS grid: NF5928262723
- Coordinates: 57.525894°N 7.695055°W

Tower
- Constructed: 1864
- Designed by: Thomas Stevenson, David Stevenson
- Construction: brick tower
- Automated: 2008
- Height: 41 metres (135 ft)
- Shape: tapered cylindrical tower with balcony and lantern attached to a 2-storey keeper’s house
- Markings: unpainted tower
- Operator: Northern Lighthouse Board
- Heritage: category B listed building

Light
- Deactivated: 1942-2008
- Focal height: 47 metres (154 ft)
- Range: 18 nautical miles (33 km; 21 mi)
- Characteristic: Fl (2) W 15s.

Shillay (Scottish Gaelic: Siolaigh or Seilaigh from the Norse selrey, meaning Seal island) is the westernmost of the Monach Islands (Heisgeir), off North Uist in the Outer Hebrides.

== Geology and geography ==
Like most of the other Monach Islands, Shillay has a thin, sandy soil, which has been much troubled by erosion, and which was badly eroded by a huge wave in the 16th century.

Despite Ceann Iar's name, meaning "western headland", Shillay is the westernmost island of the group.

There are several small islets around Shillay, including Eilean Siorraidh, Odarum (to the north) and Raisgeir.

== Lighthouses ==
The lighthouse at Shillay has an uneven history. The red brick lighthouse was built in 1864 by David & Thomas Stevenson, and was in use until it was closed during the war in 1942 and not lit again in 1948 after hostilities ceased. After the Braer disaster in 1993 in Shetland, a new light was recommended to mark the deep water route west of the Hebrides. A new automated aluminium light was installed in 1997. However it proved inadequate and in 2005 it was decided that it was cheaper to reuse the original lighthouse than to increase the height of the new light. In 2008 the old lighthouse was refurbished and put back into use.

A stone from the lighthouse has been removed into the church wall at Paible; a keeper had carved into it "Eternity Oh Eternity". Just to the south of Shillay, there is an Eilean Siorraidh ("Island of Eternity"; formerly Eilean Siorruidh) - whether this carving is a reference to this or the solitude of the island is unrecorded.

== See also ==
- List of lighthouses in Scotland
- List of Northern Lighthouse Board lighthouses
