= Monach Islands =

Archipelago of the Outer Hebrides, Scotland

Monach Isles SSSI
- IUCN category IV (habitat/species management area)
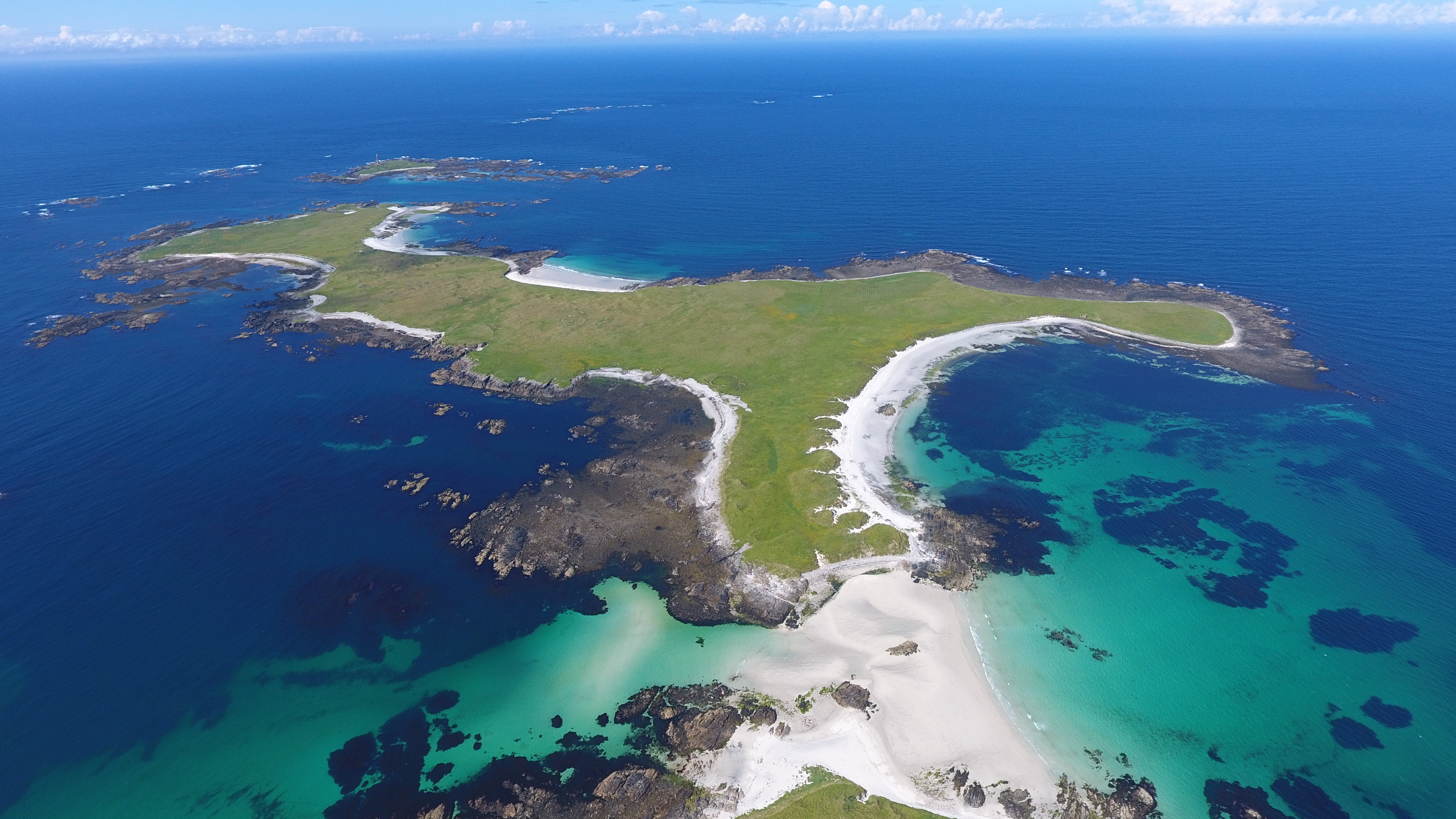
- Ceann Iar, the most westerly of the three main Monach Islands

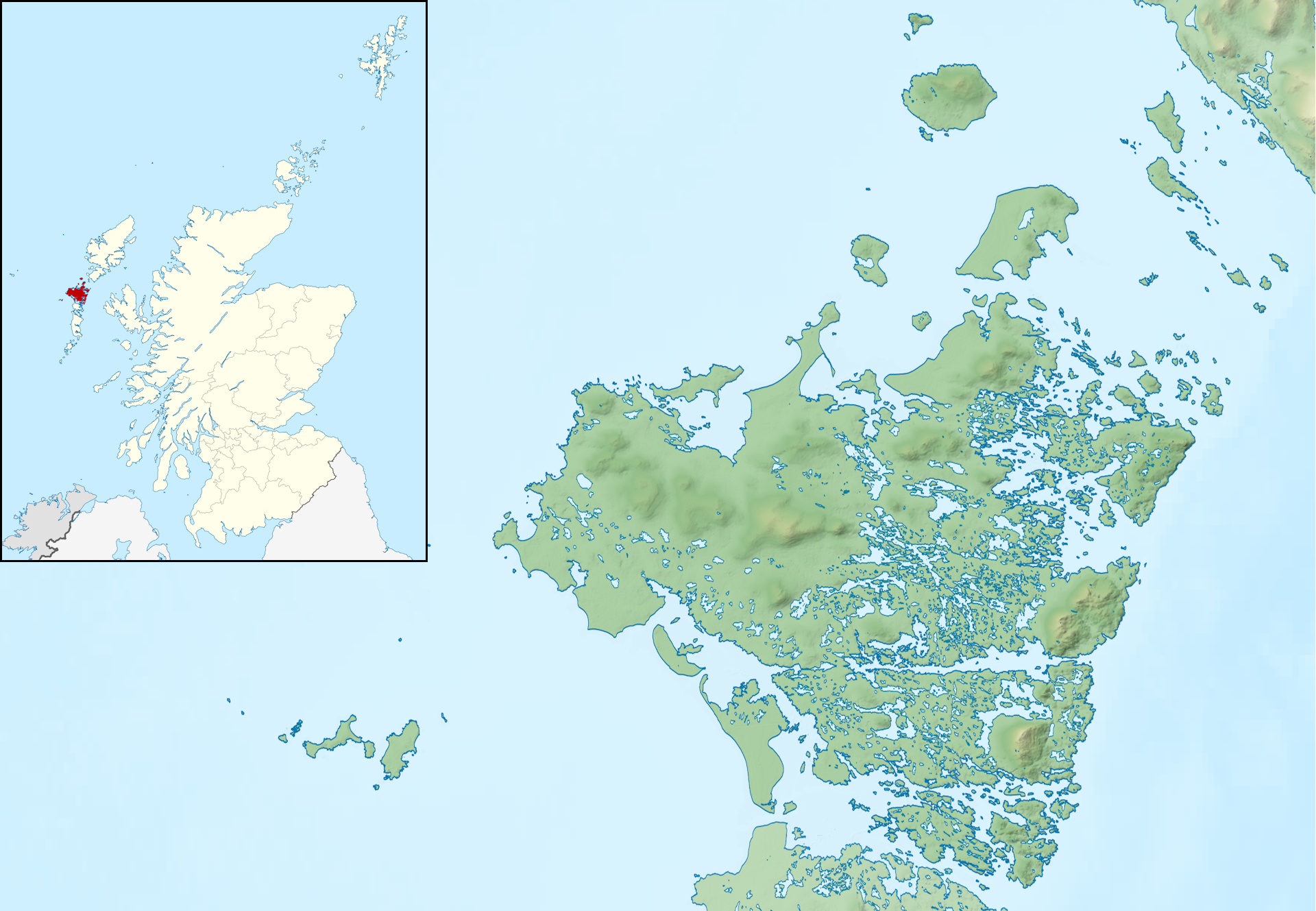
- Location within North Uist
- Location: Outer Hebrides, Scotland
- Coordinates: 57°31′N 7°40′W
- Area: 598.1 ha (1,478 acres)
- Governing body: NatureScot

The Monach Islands, also known as Heisker (Scottish Gaelic: Eilean Heillsgeir / Heillsgeir, pronounced [(elan)ˈhɤiʃkʲɪɾʲ]), are an island group west of North Uist in the Outer Hebrides of Scotland. The islands are not to be confused with Hyskeir in the Inner Hebrides, or Haskeir, which is also near North Uist and visible from the group.

== Geology and geography ==
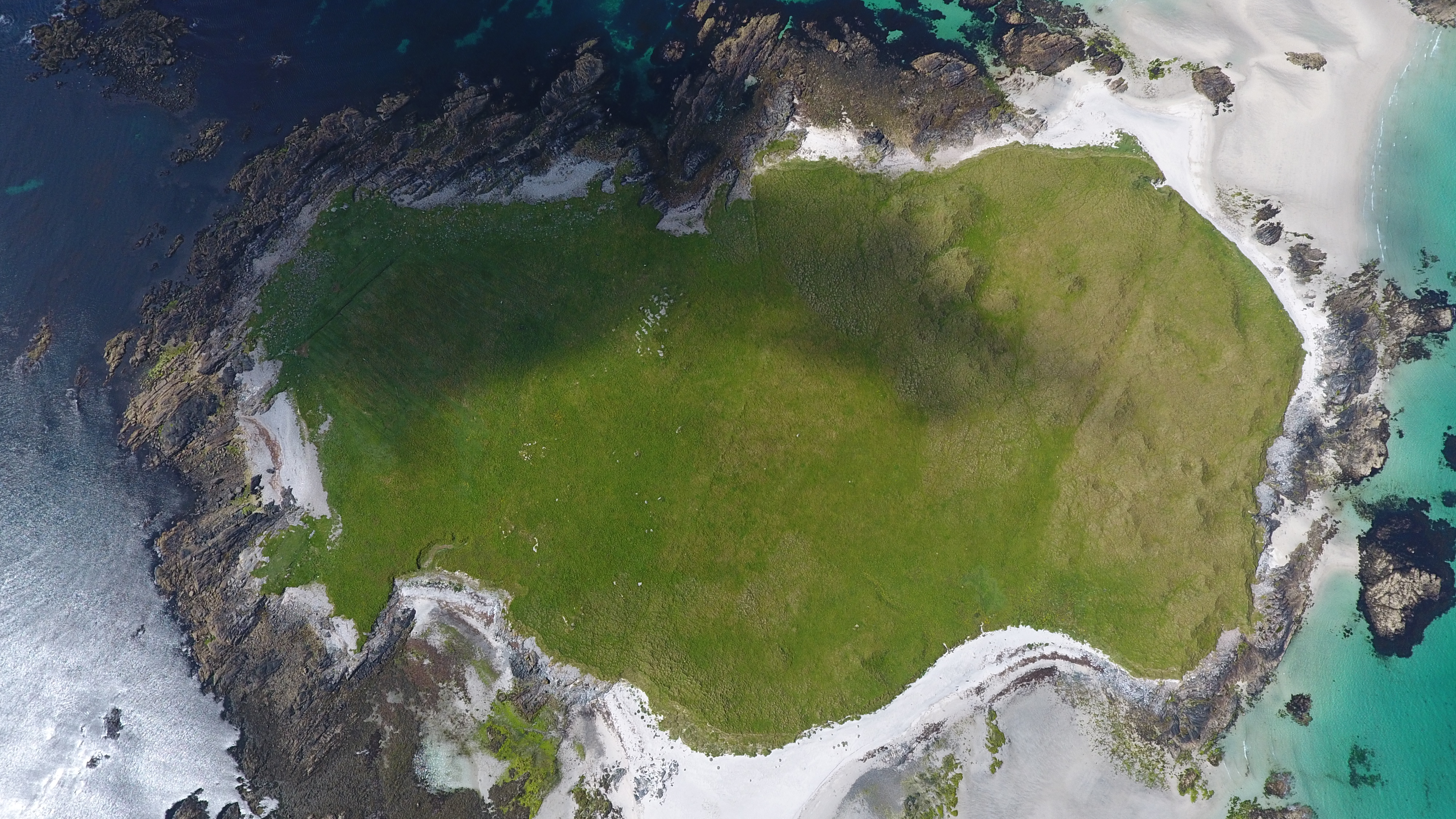
Shivinish, the middle of the three main Monach Islands

The main islands of Ceann Ear (once home to a nunnery), Ceann Iar and Shivinish (Sibhinis) are all linked at low tide. It has been claimed that it was at one time possible to walk all the way to Baleshare, and on to North Uist, five miles away at low tide. In the 17th century, a large tidal wave is said to have washed this route away. The islands of the group tend to be low-lying and sandy, subject to intense coastal erosion. Not unlike the Isles of Scilly, it is possible that Ceann Iar, Shivinish and Ceann Ear formed a single body of land within historic times, and that their land area has greatly decreased due to overgrazing, sea inundation, and wind erosion.

Smaller islands in the group include Deasker (Deas-Sgeir), Shillay (Siolaigh) and Stocaigh (or Stockay).

== History ==
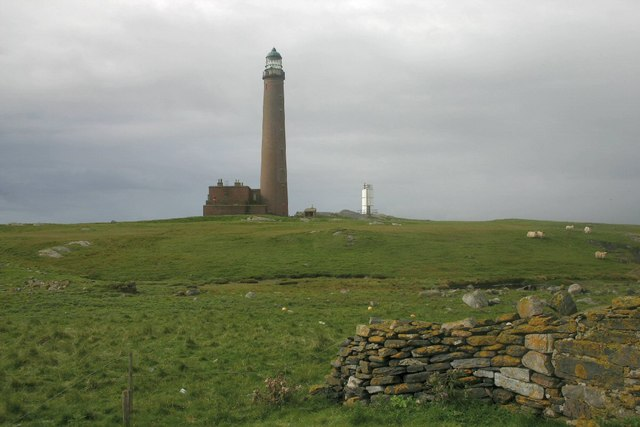
The two lighthouses on Shillay. The old lighthouse was closed in 1942; the newer light was installed in 1997. The new light was deactivated in 2008, and the old lighthouse re-activated.

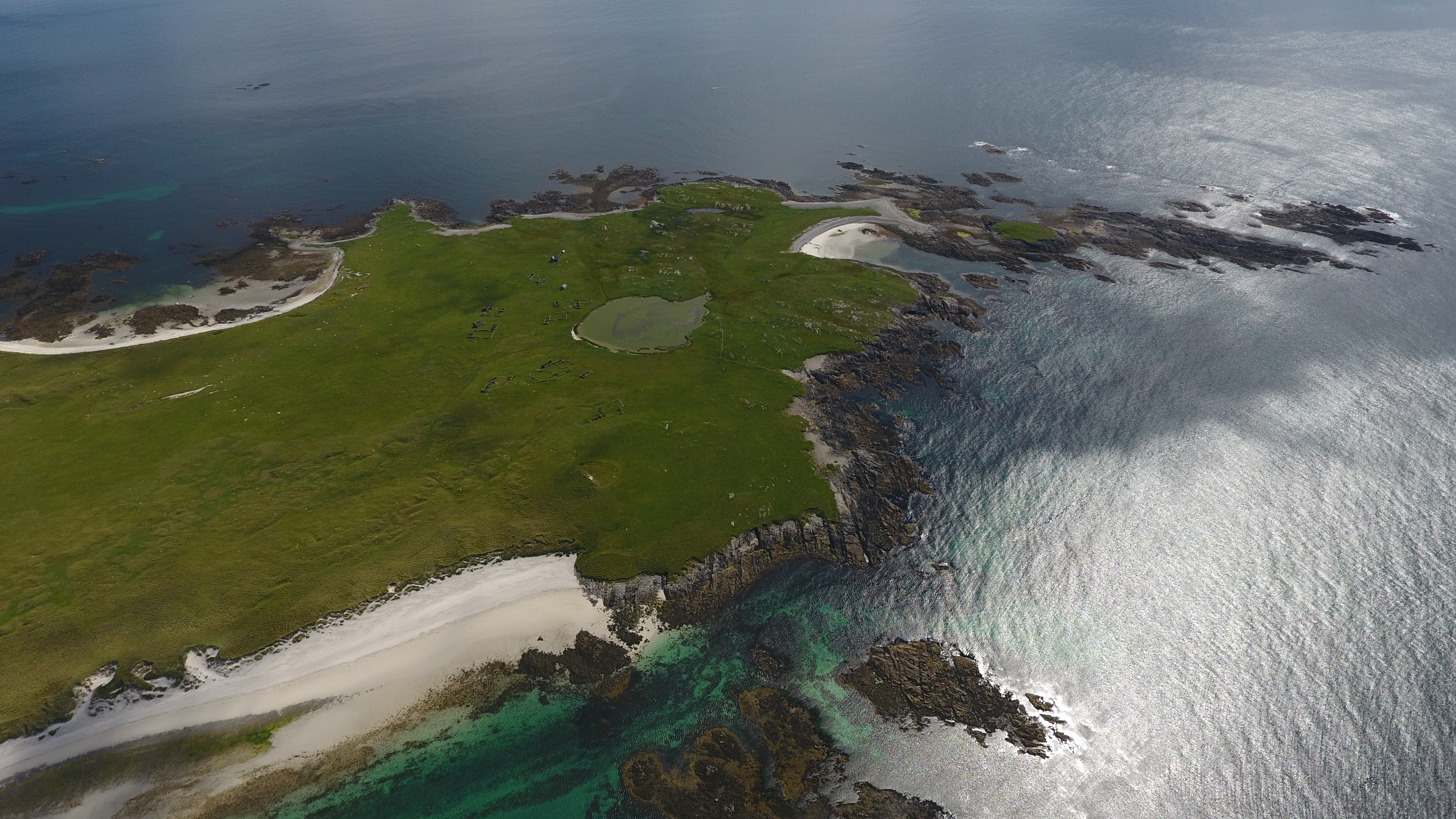
Ceann Ear, the most easterly of the three main Monach Islands including Loch nam Buadh and the ruined village

The islands have been uninhabited since 1942, but were populated by up to 100 people for centuries (possibly for a millennium or more) prior to 1810. They were originally abandoned due to overgrazing, but were resettled by 1841 in the wake of the Highland Clearances.

The 19th century census records for the islands show a fluctuating population, from 39 people in 1841 to 140 people at their peak population in 1891.

Shillay is the location of Monach Lighthouse, built by David and Thomas Stevenson in 1864. The lighthouse was closed in 1942 but, following the sinking of the oil tanker MV Braer in 1993, a new and much smaller lighthouse was built in 1997. This had a range of 10 nautical miles (19 kilometres); when a range of 18 nautical miles (33 kilometres) was deemed necessary, the new lighthouse was shut down in 2008 and the old lighthouse recommissioned with a new optic. Like all British lighthouses it is now unmanned and fully automated.

In 2007 renovations of the old schoolhouse were completed, enabling visitors to stay on the island, and learn about its history and wildlife. The old Heisgeir mailboat has also been restored at the Grimsay boatshed. The 28 ft (8.5 m) motorised open wooden boat was built circa 1932 for the last family to leave the Monach Islands, and had lain unused at Lochmaddy before being rescued by the local history society.

=== Lady Grange ===
Jacobite sympathiser James Erskine, Lord Grange (1679–1754), had his wife Rachel kidnapped and abandoned on the Monach Isles between 1732 and 1734. At the time the islands were owned by Sir Alexander MacDonald of Sleat and she was housed with his tacksman (leaseholder), another Alexander MacDonald and his wife. When Lady Grange complained about her condition, she was told by her host that he had no orders to provide her either with clothes, or food other than the normal fare he and his wife were used to. She lived in isolation, not even being told the name of the island where she was living, and it took her some time to find out who her landlord was. She was there until June 1734 when John and Norman MacLeod from North Uist arrived to move her on. They told her they were taking her to Orkney, but she was taken to Hirta where she lived from 1734 to 1742 before being taken to Skye where she died after a failed rescue attempt.

== Wildlife and conservation ==
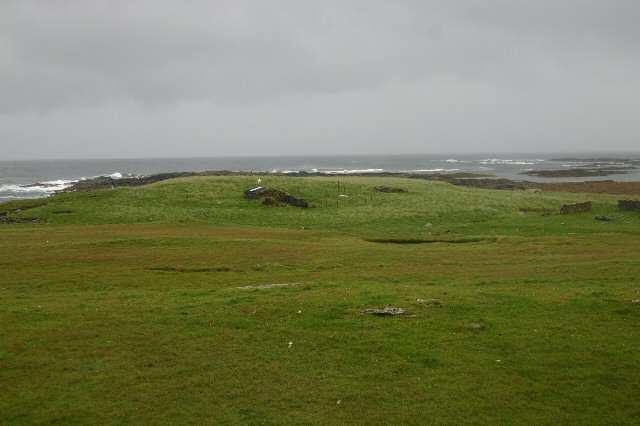
A deserted cottage on the Monach Isles

The islands are of special interest for undisturbed machair and their grey seal population. About 10,000 seals come ashore each autumn to have their pups and mate, making it one of the largest such colonies in the world. There are also a large number of nesting seabirds and a rich flora. Grey herons nest in some of the abandoned buildings. There are no trees on the islands.

The islands are designated as a Special Protection Area (SPA), a Special Area of Conservation (SAC), and a Site of Special Scientific Interest (SSSI). The International Union for Conservation of Nature (IUCN) classifies as the islands (via the SSSI designation) as meeting the criteria for a Category IV protected area. The SAC designation extends to cover the seas surrounding the group, and in 2014 a larger area of the sea surrounding the islands (in total 6,200 hectares or 18 square nautical miles) was declared a Nature Conservation Marine Protected Area (NCMPA). The designation is in place to protect the feeding grounds of the islands' seabirds, as well as the marine geomorphology of the seabed. The Monach Islands were also formerly designated as a National Nature Reserve, but this designation was withdrawn in May 2018.

== See also ==
- List of islands of Scotland
