= Kirkibost =

Island in the Outer Hebrides, Scotland

Eilean Chirceaboist (Gaelic)
- Towards Kirkibost Island Looking out across the sea towards the sand dunes at the southern end of Kirkibost Island

Location
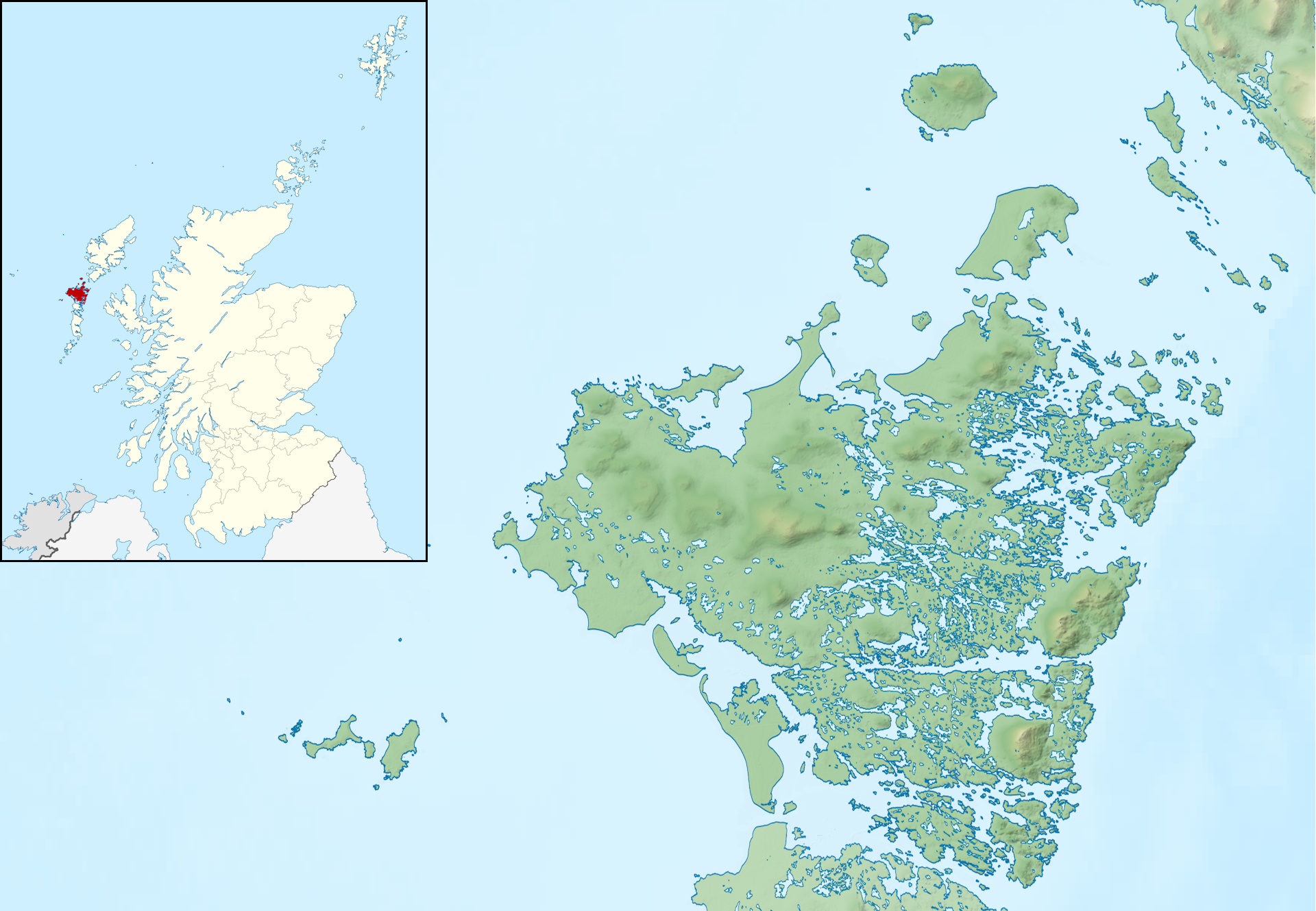
- Kirkibost shown next to North Uist Kirkibost shown within the Outer Hebrides
- OS grid reference: NF758640
- Coordinates: 57.56°N 7.42°W

Physical geography
- Island group: Uists and Barra
- Area: 205
- Area rank: 105=
- Highest elevation: 7 m (23 ft)

Administration
- Council area: Outer Hebrides
- Country: Scotland
- Sovereign state: United Kingdom

Demographics
- Population: 0

Kirkibost (Scottish Gaelic: Eilean Chirceaboist) is a low-lying island west of North Uist in the Outer Hebrides of Scotland.

== Geography ==
Kirkibost, along with neighbouring Baleshare, is covered by a machair system of coastal plains covered with shell sand, part covered by grass, with some sand dunes, fens and peat. Together with Baleshare, it forms part of a Site of Special Scientific Interest. The small islands of Eilean Mòr, Bior-eilean and Sròmaigh lie between Kirkibost and North Uist.

== Wildlife ==
The island is important for corncrakes, various wading birds and overwintering wildfowl.

== Economy ==
Kirkibost has been cultivated in the past, but is now used only for seasonal cattle grazing.
