= Listed buildings in Speldhurst =

Civil Parish in Kent, England

Speldhurst is a village and civil parish in the Borough of Tunbridge Wells of Kent, England. It contains 167 listed buildings that are recorded in the National Heritage List for England. Of these six are grade I, 24 are grade II* and 137 are grade II.

This list is based on the information retrieved online from Historic England.

== Key ==
Grade	Criteria
I	Buildings that are of exceptional interest
II*	Particularly important buildings of more than special interest
II	Buildings that are of special interest

== Listing ==
Name	Grade	Location	Type	Completed (Note: The date given is the date used by Historic England as significant for the initial building or that of an important part in the structure's description.)	Date designated	Grid ref. (Note: The grid reference is based on the British national grid reference system, sometimes known as OSGB36, used by the Ordnance Survey.) Geo-coordinates	Notes	Entry number (Note: The "List Entry Number" is a unique number assigned to each listed building and scheduled monument by Historic England.)	Image	Wikidata
Anonymous Headstone Approximately 5 Metres South of the Porch of the Church of St Martin	II	Ashurst Hill, Ashurst			24 August 1990	TQ5117139025; 51°07′50″N 0°09′33″E		1356642	Upload Photo	Q26639279
Ashurst Post Office	II	Ashurst Hill, Ashurst			7 April 1982	TQ5093938936; 51°07′47″N 0°09′21″E		1356639	Upload Photo	Q26639276
Church of St Martin of Tours	I	Ashurst Hill, Ashurst	church building		20 October 1954	TQ5117339037; 51°07′50″N 0°09′33″E		1074896	Church of St Martin of Tours More images	Q17530335
Everest Headstone Approximately 9 Metres South of the Chancel of the Church of St Martin	II	Ashurst Hill, Ashurst			24 August 1990	TQ5117639025; 51°07′50″N 0°09′33″E		1067593	Upload Photo	Q26320400
Field Chest Tomb Approximately 25 Metres South of the Chancel of the Church If St Martin	II	Ashurst Hill, Ashurst			24 August 1990	TQ5119639026; 51°07′50″N 0°09′34″E		1356669	Upload Photo	Q26639306
Orchard Cottages	II	1, 2 and 3, Ashurst Hill, Ashurst			24 August 1990	TQ5076138976; 51°07′49″N 0°09′12″E		1067582	Upload Photo	Q26320390
Pair of Salmon Headstones Approximately 10 Metres South of the Chancel of the Church of St Martin	II	Ashurst Hill, Ashurst			24 August 1990	TQ5118039023; 51°07′50″N 0°09′33″E		1360987	Upload Photo	Q26643024
Row of 6 Woodhams Headstones Approximately 6 Metres South of the Nave of the Church of St Martin	II	Ashurst Hill			24 August 1990	TQ5116839026; 51°07′50″N 0°09′33″E		1067562	Upload Photo	Q26320377
Simson Headstone Approximately 10 Metres South of the Porch of the Church of St Martin	II	Ashurst Hill, Ashurst			24 August 1990	TQ5117739023; 51°07′50″N 0°09′33″E		1074897	Upload Photo	Q26337469
St Martin	II	Ashurst Hill, Ashurst			24 August 1990	TQ5113539063; 51°07′51″N 0°09′31″E		1067585	Upload Photo	Q26320393
Sundial Approximately 5 Metres South of the Chancel of the Church of St Martin	II	Ashurst Hill, Ashurst			24 August 1990	TQ5118139029; 51°07′50″N 0°09′33″E		1067591	Upload Photo	Q26320399
Towner Jones Chest Tomb Approximately 12 Metres North East of the Chancel of the Church of St Martin	II	Ashurst Hill, Ashurst			24 August 1990	TQ5119039047; 51°07′51″N 0°09′34″E		1360988	Upload Photo	Q26643025
Woodhams Headstone Approximately 8 Metres South of the Nave of the Church of St Martin	II	Ashurst Hill, Ashurst			24 August 1990	TQ5116939025; 51°07′50″N 0°09′33″E		1074898	Upload Photo	Q26337471
Former Farm Building to the South-west of the Old Barn	II	Barden Road, TN3 0LH			12 December 2014	TQ5488642382; 51°09′35″N 0°12′49″E		1423150	Upload Photo	Q26676990
Holmewood House School	II	Barrow Lane			24 August 1990	TQ5521238620; 51°07′33″N 0°13′00″E		1067565	Upload Photo	Q99937471
11 Bird-in-hand Street	II*	11, Bird-in-hand Street, Old Groombridge			20 October 1954	TQ5295037751; 51°07′07″N 0°11′02″E		1261076	Upload Photo	Q17547612
12, Bird-in-hand Street	II*	12, Bird-in-hand Street, Old Groombridge			20 October 1954	TQ5294437746; 51°07′07″N 0°11′02″E		1356672	Upload Photo	Q17547841
3 and 4, Bird-in-hand Street	II*	3 and 4, Bird-in-hand Street, Old Groombridge			20 October 1954	TQ5298137702; 51°07′05″N 0°11′04″E		1067571	Upload Photo	Q17547160
5, Bird-in-hand Street	II*	5, Bird-in-hand Street, Old Groombridge			20 October 1954	TQ5297437725; 51°07′06″N 0°11′03″E		1067572	Upload Photo	Q17547165
6, Bird-in-hand Street	II*	6, Bird-in-hand Street, Old Groombridge			20 October 1954	TQ5297037730; 51°07′06″N 0°11′03″E		1356671	Upload Photo	Q17547835
7, Bird-in-hand Street	II*	7, Bird-in-hand Street, Old Groombridge			20 October 1954	TQ5296637734; 51°07′07″N 0°11′03″E		1067573	Upload Photo	Q17547171
8, 9 and 10, Bird-in-hand Street	II	8, 9 and 10, Bird-in-hand Street, Old Groombridge			20 October 1954	TQ5296137741; 51°07′07″N 0°11′03″E		1067574	Upload Photo	Q26320382
Court Lodge	II*	Bird-in-hand Street, Old Groombridge			20 October 1954	TQ5288437770; 51°07′08″N 0°10′59″E		1240325	Upload Photo	Q17547463
Gate Piers and Flanking Walls Approximately 15 Metres North West of the Lodge	II	Bird-in-hand Street, Old Groombridge			24 August 1990	TQ5299337676; 51°07′05″N 0°11′04″E		1067569	Upload Photo	Q26320381
Rose Cottage	II*	2, Bird-in-hand Street, Old Groombridge			20 October 1954	TQ5298737691; 51°07′05″N 0°11′04″E		1067570	Upload Photo	Q17547155
The Lodge	II	Bird-in-hand Street, Old Groombridge			24 August 1990	TQ5297937662; 51°07′04″N 0°11′04″E		1067568	Upload Photo	Q26320380
The Old Forge	II	Bird-in-hand Street, Old Groombridge			20 October 1954	TQ5297737716; 51°07′06″N 0°11′04″E		1356670	Upload Photo	Q26639307
The Old Town Post Office Including Front Area Railings	II*	Bird-in-hand Street, Old Groombridge	post office		20 October 1954	TQ5300637663; 51°07′04″N 0°11′05″E		1067567	The Old Town Post Office Including Front Area Railings More images	Q17547149
The Old Butchers	II*	Bird-in-the-hand Street, Old Groombridge	architectural structure		20 October 1954	TQ5301537651; 51°07′04″N 0°11′05″E		1067566	The Old Butchers More images	Q17547143
Broom Farmhouse	II	Broom Lane			24 August 1990	TQ5457838549; 51°07′31″N 0°12′27″E		1240332	Upload Photo	Q26533262
Broomlands Including Retaining Wall to the Terrace to the South	II	Broom Lane			24 August 1990	TQ5445538919; 51°07′43″N 0°12′21″E		1067575	Upload Photo	Q26320383
Pair of Gate Piers and Gates at the Entrance to the Hollands	II	Broom Lane			24 August 1990	TQ5437238920; 51°07′44″N 0°12′17″E		1240358	Upload Photo	Q26533287
The Hollands	II	Broom Lane			17 March 1988	TQ5420238650; 51°07′35″N 0°12′08″E		1356673	Upload Photo	Q26639308
Barn Approximately 6 Metres North East of Old Bullingstone	II	Bullingstone Lane, TN3 0JY			24 August 1990	TQ5441241160; 51°08′56″N 0°12′23″E		1240362	Upload Photo	Q26533291
Old Bullingstone	II	Bullingstone Lane, TN3 0JY			17 August 1987	TQ5440041151; 51°08′56″N 0°12′22″E		1261068	Upload Photo	Q26552045
The Cottage and Holly Cottage	II	Bullingstone Lane			24 August 1990	TQ5442341137; 51°08′55″N 0°12′23″E		1240361	Upload Photo	Q26533290
The Old Farmhouse	II	Bullingstone Lane			24 August 1990	TQ5448741138; 51°08′55″N 0°12′26″E		1240360	Upload Photo	Q26533289
Bonds	II	Bullington Lane			24 August 1990	TQ5451841080; 51°08′53″N 0°12′28″E		1261067	Upload Photo	Q26552044
St Michaels	II	Burrswood, Old Groombridge			18 January 1977	TQ5209037732; 51°07′07″N 0°10′18″E		1240363	Upload Photo	Q26533292
Terrace Walls and Steps to the Garden South of St Michaels	II	Burrswood, Old Groombridge			18 January 1977	TQ5207937712; 51°07′07″N 0°10′17″E		1261069	Upload Photo	Q26552046
Walls to the Vegetable Garden North East of St Michaels	II	Burrswood, Old Groombridge			24 August 1990	TQ5226037780; 51°07′09″N 0°10′27″E		1240364	Upload Photo	Q26533293
Little Bote House	II	Etherington Hill			17 July 1990	TQ5618141729; 51°09′13″N 0°13′55″E		1240365	Upload Photo	Q26533294
Old Broomhill Farmhouse	II	Etherington Hill			24 August 1990	TQ5668541722; 51°09′12″N 0°14′20″E		1261070	Upload Photo	Q26552047
Farnham House	II	Farnham Lane			24 August 1990	TQ5523439894; 51°08′14″N 0°13′03″E		1261071	Upload Photo	Q26552048
Hole Farmhouse	II	Farnham Lane			24 August 1990	TQ5539240162; 51°08′23″N 0°13′12″E		1261001	Upload Photo	Q26551982
Little Farnham	II	Farnham Lane			24 August 1990	TQ5505839875; 51°08′14″N 0°12′54″E		1240366	Upload Photo	Q26533295
Black Lion Including Walls Adjoining to East and West	II	Fordcombe Road, Ashurst Park			24 August 1990	TQ5316639694; 51°08′10″N 0°11′16″E		1240491	Upload Photo	Q26533414
Fernchase Manor	II	Fordcombe Road, Ashurst Park			25 April 1990	TQ5318939424; 51°08′01″N 0°11′17″E		1240499	Upload Photo	Q26533422
Lake Cottage	II	Fordcombe Road, Ashurst Park			24 August 1990	TQ5319139525; 51°08′04″N 0°11′17″E		1261072	Upload Photo	Q26552049
Langton Lodge	II	Fordcombe Road, Ashurst Park			24 August 1990	TQ5354839001; 51°07′47″N 0°11′35″E		1240367	Upload Photo	Q26533296
Langton Park Lodge	II	Fordcombe Road, Ashurst Park			24 August 1990	TQ5350139472; 51°08′02″N 0°11′33″E		1240480	Upload Photo	Q26533403
Gates, Gate Piers and Flanking Walls to the Cottage	II	Groombridge Hill, Old Groombridge			24 August 1990	TQ5328737958; 51°07′13″N 0°11′20″E		1260888	Upload Photo	Q26551873
Walls, Gate Piers and Gates at the Entrance to the Manor	II	Speldhurst Hill			24 August 1990	TQ5541741455; 51°09′05″N 0°13′15″E		1241632	Upload Photo	Q26534499
Barn Approximately 140 Metres North East of Groombridge Place	II	Groombridge Hill, Old Groombridge			24 August 1990	TQ5342137758; 51°07′07″N 0°11′26″E		1240707	Upload Photo	Q26533617
Blue Cottage	II	Groombridge Hill, Old Groombridge			24 August 1990	TQ5337038016; 51°07′15″N 0°11′24″E		1240715	Upload Photo	Q26533622
Camfield Chest Tomb Approximately 4 Metres South of the Nave of the Chapel of St John	II	Groombridge Hill, Old Groombridge			24 August 1990	TQ5306537666; 51°07′04″N 0°11′08″E		1240710	Upload Photo	Q26533619
Chapel of St John the Evangelist	I	Groombridge Hill, Old Groombridge	chapel		20 October 1954	TQ5306537682; 51°07′05″N 0°11′08″E		1240708	Chapel of St John the Evangelist More images	Q17524606
Crown Cottage	II*	Groombridge Hill, Old Groombridge			20 October 1954	TQ5307037715; 51°07′06″N 0°11′08″E		1240711	Upload Photo	Q17547482
Fountain Cottages	II	Groombridge Hill, Old Groombridge			11 January 1990	TQ5323337934; 51°07′13″N 0°11′17″E		1260887	Upload Photo	Q26551872
Garden Walls and Features of the Terraced Garden (including Ivy Cottage) Approximately 30 Metres North of Groombridge Place	I	Groombridge Hill, Old Groombridge			20 October 1954	TQ5328437681; 51°07′05″N 0°11′19″E		1240706	Upload Photo	Q17530364
Groombridge Place	I	Groombridge Hill, Old Groombridge	manor house		20 October 1954	TQ5334137619; 51°07′02″N 0°11′22″E		1260959	Groombridge Place More images	Q1547383
Group of 3 Camfield Chest Tombs Approximately 2 Metres South of the Nave of the Chapel of St John	II	Groombridge Hill, Old Groombridge			24 August 1990	TQ5306837670; 51°07′04″N 0°11′08″E		1240709	Upload Photo	Q26533618
Hillside	II	Groombridge Hill, Old Groombridge			12 December 1980	TQ5344838078; 51°07′17″N 0°11′28″E		1240716	Upload Photo	Q26533623
Mill Adjoining to East of Mill House	II*	Groombridge Hill, Old Groombridge			24 August 1990	TQ5306837581; 51°07′01″N 0°11′08″E		1240549	Upload Photo	Q17547474
Mill House	II*	Groombridge Hill, Old Groombridge			24 August 1990	TQ5306037579; 51°07′01″N 0°11′08″E		1240668	Upload Photo	Q17547478
Roadside Horse Trough and Drinking Fountain	II	Groombridge Hill, Old Groombridge			24 August 1990	TQ5327237944; 51°07′13″N 0°11′19″E		1240714	Upload Photo	Q26533621
Somerden	II*	Groombridge Hill, Old Groombridge			20 October 1954	TQ5308437739; 51°07′07″N 0°11′09″E		1240712	Upload Photo	Q17547486
Stable Approximately 15 Metres South West of Mill House	II	Groombridge Hill, Old Groombridge			24 August 1990	TQ5307337569; 51°07′01″N 0°11′08″E		1240682	Upload Photo	Q26533594
Stone Cottages	II	Groombridge Hill, Old Groombridge			24 August 1990	TQ5368138353; 51°07′26″N 0°11′41″E		1240713	Upload Photo	Q26533620
Sundial Approximately 7 Metres East of Groombridge Place	II	Groombridge Hill, Old Groombridge			24 August 1990	TQ5335637623; 51°07′03″N 0°11′23″E		1240550	Upload Photo	Q26533469
The Cottage	II	Groombridge Hill, Old Groombridge			24 August 1990	TQ5325837961; 51°07′14″N 0°11′18″E		1240873	Upload Photo	Q26533770
The Dower House	II*	Groombridge Hill, Old Groombridge			20 October 1954	TQ5301937634; 51°07′03″N 0°11′06″E		1260835	Upload Photo	Q17547607
Buildings of the Service Courtyard Adjoining South of Groombridge Place Including the Walls of the Herb Garden	I	Groombridge Place, Groombridge Hill, Old Groombridge			20 October 1954	TQ5335637592; 51°07′02″N 0°11′23″E		1260883	Upload Photo	Q17524652
Former Lodge to the Burrswood Estate	II	Groombridge Road, Groombridge, TN3 9PT, Stone Cross			24 August 1990	TQ5232038552; 51°07′34″N 0°10′31″E		1260889	Upload Photo	Q26551874
Burnt Cottage	II	Langton Road			24 August 1990	TQ5486440412; 51°08′31″N 0°12′45″E		1260575	Upload Photo	Q26551578
Burnt House Sandstones	II	Langton Road			24 August 1990	TQ5485140394; 51°08′31″N 0°12′44″E		1240936	Upload Photo	Q26533832
Coach House Adjoining South of the Glebe House	II	Langton Road			24 August 1990	TQ5534141343; 51°09′01″N 0°13′11″E		1240934	Upload Photo	Q26533830
Danemore Lodge	II	Langton Road			24 August 1990	TQ5474540271; 51°08′27″N 0°12′38″E		1240937	Upload Photo	Q26533833
Danemore Park	II	Langton Road			24 August 1990	TQ5430540613; 51°08′38″N 0°12′16″E		1241323	Upload Photo	Q26534205
Dornden Innerdown Middle House	II	Langton Road, Langton Green			24 August 1990	TQ5592039267; 51°07′53″N 0°13′37″E		1240929	Upload Photo	Q26533825
Little Oaklands Oaklands House Oaklands House and Little Oaklands Including Front Boundary Railings	II	Langton Road, Langton Green			24 August 1990	TQ5494039225; 51°07′53″N 0°12′47″E		1240717	Upload Photo	Q26533624
Rusthall	II	Langton Road, Langton Green			24 August 1990	TQ5610439189; 51°07′51″N 0°13′47″E		1079101	Upload Photo	Q26350756
Shadwell	II	Langton Road			20 October 1954	TQ5534641252; 51°08′58″N 0°13′11″E		1240935	Upload Photo	Q26533831
Speldhurst County Primary School	II	Langton Road			24 August 1990	TQ5531041309; 51°09′00″N 0°13′09″E		1260770	Upload Photo	Q26551764
The Old Cottage	II	Langton Road, Langton Green			24 August 1990	TQ5600339245; 51°07′52″N 0°13′42″E		1358919	Upload Photo	Q26641264
The Rectory Including Front Boundary Wall	II	Langton Road			24 August 1990	TQ5534741369; 51°09′02″N 0°13′11″E		1260769	Upload Photo	Q26551763
Shirley Hall	II	Leggs Lane			24 August 1990	TQ5405939961; 51°08′18″N 0°12′03″E		1241334	Upload Photo	Q26534216
Stable Court at Shirley Hall	II	Leggs Lane			24 August 1990	TQ5407140004; 51°08′19″N 0°12′03″E		1241351	Upload Photo	Q26534232
Smallbrook Cottage	II	Lower Green Road			24 August 1990	TQ5582641416; 51°09′03″N 0°13′36″E		1240938	Upload Photo	Q26533834
Priestwood Cottage	II	Old House Lane, Ashurst Park			24 August 1990	TQ5344039570; 51°08′05″N 0°11′30″E		1240939	Upload Photo	Q26533835
Barn Approximately 2 Metres North of Nos 1, 2 and 3 Silcocks Cottages	II	2 and 3 Silcocks Cottages, Poundsbridge Lane			24 August 1990	TQ5357340441; 51°08′34″N 0°11′38″E		1260532	Upload Photo	Q26551538
Silcocks Cottages	II	1, 2 and 3, Poundsbridge Lane			13 March 1974	TQ5357240425; 51°08′33″N 0°11′38″E		1240940	Upload Photo	Q26533836
Anonymous Chest Tomb Approximately 1.5 Metres South of the Chancel of the Church of St Mary the Virgin	II	Speldhurst Hill			24 August 1990	TQ5537841436; 51°09′04″N 0°13′13″E		1241418	Upload Photo	Q26534300
Anonymous Chest Tomb Approximately 3 Metres West of the Tower of the Church of St Mary the Virgin	II	Speldhurst Hill			24 August 1990	TQ5532841432; 51°09′04″N 0°13′10″E		1241419	Upload Photo	Q26534301
Anonymous Chest Tomb Approximately 8 Metres South of the Nave of the Church of St Mary the Virgin	II	Speldhurst Hill			24 August 1990	TQ5535041414; 51°09′03″N 0°13′11″E		1241456	Upload Photo	Q26534336
Anonymous Coffin Slab Approximately 11 Metres South of the Porch of the Church of St Mary the Virgin	II	Speldhurst Hill			24 August 1990	TQ5534941404; 51°09′03″N 0°13′11″E		1260513	Upload Photo	Q26551519
Anonymous Headstone Approximately 6 Metres South of the Chancel of the Church of St Mary the Virgin	II	Speldhurst Hill			24 August 1990	TQ5537741430; 51°09′04″N 0°13′13″E		1260452	Upload Photo	Q26551462
Bellingham Headstone Approximately 10 Metres South of the Porch of the Church of St Mary the Virgin	II	Speldhurst Hill			24 August 1990	TQ5534941407; 51°09′03″N 0°13′11″E		1260471	Upload Photo	Q26551479
Blake Headstone 4 Metres North East of the Organ Loft of the Church of St Mary the Virgin	II	Speldhurst Hill			24 August 1990	TQ5536341453; 51°09′05″N 0°13′12″E		1241422	Upload Photo	Q26534304
Burrows Chest Tomb Approximately 1.5 Metres North of the Tower of the Church of St Mary the Virgin	II	Speldhurst Hill			24 August 1990	TQ5533541440; 51°09′04″N 0°13′11″E		1241415	Upload Photo	Q26534297
Church of St Mary the Virgin	II*	Speldhurst Hill	church building		20 October 1954	TQ5535341438; 51°09′04″N 0°13′11″E		1240943	Church of St Mary the Virgin More images	Q17547490
Coombin Headstone Adjacent North Wall of the Aisle of the Church of St Mary the Virgin	II	Speldhurst Hill			24 August 1990	TQ5535241450; 51°09′04″N 0°13′11″E		1260515	Upload Photo	Q26551521
Front Boundary Wall Approximately 30 Metres South of the Old Place	II	Speldhurst Hill			24 August 1990	TQ5532041381; 51°09′02″N 0°13′10″E		1240942	Upload Photo	Q26533838
Gossum Headstone Approximately 12m South West of the Tower of the Church of St Mary the Virgin	II	Speldhurst Hill			24 August 1990	TQ5533341410; 51°09′03″N 0°13′10″E		1241522	Upload Photo	Q26534396
Group of 3 C18 Headstones Approximately 13 Metres South of the Tower of the Church of St Mary the Virgin	II	Speldhurst Hill			24 August 1990	TQ5534941403; 51°09′03″N 0°13′11″E		1241528	Upload Photo	Q26534403
Group of 3 Chest Tombs Approximately 6 Metres North of the Porch of the Church of St Mary the Virgin	II	Speldhurst Hill			24 August 1990	TQ5534241472; 51°09′05″N 0°13′11″E		1260506	Upload Photo	Q26551512
Group of 3 Chest Tombs Approximately 6 Metres North of the Vestry of the Church of St Mary the Virgin	II	Speldhurst Hill			24 August 1990	TQ5537241468; 51°09′05″N 0°13′13″E		1260514	Upload Photo	Q26551520
Group of 3 Chest Tombs Approximately 9 Metres North of the Aisle of the Church of St Mary the Virgin	II	Speldhurst Hill			24 August 1990	TQ5535741470; 51°09′05″N 0°13′12″E		1241421	Upload Photo	Q26534303
Group of 4 Chest Tombs Approximately 12 Metres North of the Tower of the Church of St Mary the Virgin	II	Speldhurst Hill			24 August 1990	TQ5532641457; 51°09′05″N 0°13′10″E		1241420	Upload Photo	Q26534302
Group of 5 C18 Headstones Approximately 11 Metres South of the Tower of the Church of St Mary the Virgin	II	Speldhurst Hill			24 August 1990	TQ5533741403; 51°09′03″N 0°13′11″E		1241602	Upload Photo	Q26534471
Johnstone Chest Tomb Approximately 3 Metres South of the Chancel of the Church of St Mary the Virgin	II	Speldhurst Hill			24 August 1990	TQ5538141433; 51°09′04″N 0°13′13″E		1241416	Upload Photo	Q26534298
Knell Headstone Approximately 2 Metres West of the Tower of the Church of St Mary the Virgin	II	Speldhurst Hill			24 August 1990	TQ5532841435; 51°09′04″N 0°13′10″E		1241525	Upload Photo	Q26534399
Lower Church Farmhouse	II	Speldhurst Hill			24 August 1990	TQ5542541663; 51°09′11″N 0°13′16″E		1260426	Upload Photo	Q26551440
Lychgate to Churchyard of the Church of St Mary the Virgin	II	Speldhurst Hill			24 August 1990	TQ5533441388; 51°09′02″N 0°13′10″E		1241400	Upload Photo	Q26534282
Morley Chest Tomb Approximately 7 Metres South of the Tower of the Church of St Mary the Virgin	II	Speldhurst Hill			24 August 1990	TQ5533841417; 51°09′03″N 0°13′11″E		1241417	Upload Photo	Q26534299
Nesbitt Memorial Approximately 16 Metres North East of the Vestry of the Church of St Mary the Virgin	II	Speldhurst Hill			24 August 1990	TQ5537941463; 51°09′05″N 0°13′13″E		1241414	Upload Photo	Q26534296
Okill Headstone Approximately 3 Metres East of the Chancel of the Church of St Mary the Virgin	II	Speldhurst Hill			24 August 1990	TQ5537041447; 51°09′04″N 0°13′12″E		1260451	Upload Photo	Q26551461
Old Place	II	Speldhurst Hill			24 August 1990	TQ5530941414; 51°09′03″N 0°13′09″E		1240941	Upload Photo	Q26533837
Old Post Office Cottage	II*	Speldhurst Hill			24 August 1990	TQ5539341486; 51°09′06″N 0°13′14″E		1260453	Upload Photo	Q17547602
Pair of Coyte Headstones Adjacent East Wall of the Chancel of the Church of St Mary the Virgin	II	Speldhurst Hill			24 August 1990	TQ5537041442; 51°09′04″N 0°13′12″E		1241501	Upload Photo	Q26534377
Pair of Cripps Headstones Approximately 12 Metres South West of the Tower of the Church of St Mary the Virgin	II	Speldhurst Hill			24 August 1990	TQ5533441412; 51°09′03″N 0°13′10″E		1241423	Upload Photo	Q26534305
Pair of Drury Headstones Approximately 7 Metres South of the Nave of the Church of St Mary the Virgin	II	Speldhurst Hill			24 August 1990	TQ5535541418; 51°09′03″N 0°13′12″E		1241424	Upload Photo	Q26534306
Pair of Friend Headstones Approximately 3 Metres South of the Porch of the Church of St Mary the Virgin	II	Speldhurst Hill			24 August 1990	TQ5534941421; 51°09′03″N 0°13′11″E		1241520	Upload Photo	Q26534394
Revettment Wall on North East and South East Sides of the Churchyard	II	Speldhurst Hill			24 August 1990	TQ5537241413; 51°09′03″N 0°13′12″E		1241619	Upload Photo	Q26534486
Row of 3 May Headstones Approximately 20 Metres North East of the Chancel of the Church of St Mary the Virgin	II	Speldhurst Hill			24 August 1990	TQ5539041470; 51°09′05″N 0°13′13″E		1241526	Upload Photo	Q26534401
Row of 5 Jeffery Headstones Approximately 9 Metres South of the Tower of the Church of St Mary the Virgin	II	Speldhurst Hill			24 August 1990	TQ5534741403; 51°09′03″N 0°13′11″E		1241524	Upload Photo	Q26534398
Row of 6 Cooke Headstones Approximately 9 Metres South of the Tower of the Church of St Mary the Virgin	II	Speldhurst Hill			24 August 1990	TQ5533641405; 51°09′03″N 0°13′11″E		1260473	Upload Photo	Q26551481
Row of Fry Headstones Approximately 4 Metres East of the Chancel of the Church of St Mary the Virgin	II	Speldhurst Hill			24 August 1990	TQ5537241444; 51°09′04″N 0°13′12″E		1241521	Upload Photo	Q26534395
Row of Headstones Approximately 12 Metres South West of the Tower of the Church of St Mary the Virgin	II	Speldhurst Hill			24 August 1990	TQ5533041400; 51°09′03″N 0°13′10″E		1260417	Upload Photo	Q26551434
Row of Jarret Headstones Approximately 3 Metres North East of the Chancel of the Church of St Mary the Virgin	II	Speldhurst Hill			24 August 1990	TQ5537041451; 51°09′04″N 0°13′12″E		1241523	Upload Photo	Q26534397
Scattered Group of 4 C18 Headstones Between 6-18 Metres East of the Chancel of the Church of St Mary the Virgin	II	Speldhurst Hill			24 August 1990	TQ5538741448; 51°09′04″N 0°13′13″E		1241529	Upload Photo	Q26534404
Skinner Headstone Approximately 8 Metres South of the Nave of the Church of St Mary the Virgin	II	Speldhurst Hill			24 August 1990	TQ5536441420; 51°09′03″N 0°13′12″E		1241527	Upload Photo	Q26534402
The Cottage	II	Speldhurst Hill			20 October 1954	TQ5541741439; 51°09′04″N 0°13′15″E		1241626	Upload Photo	Q26680812
The George and Dragon	II*	Speldhurst Hill	pub		20 October 1954	TQ5538441388; 51°09′02″N 0°13′13″E		1241530	The George and Dragon More images	Q17547496
The Manor	II	Speldhurst Hill			24 August 1990	TQ5544841443; 51°09′04″N 0°13′16″E		1241631	Upload Photo	Q26534498
The Mill Building	II	Speldhurst Hill			8 July 2004	TQ5581141670; 51°09′11″N 0°13′35″E		1390903	Upload Photo	Q26670279
War Memorial Approximately 12 Metres South of the Porch of the Church of St Mary the Virgin	II	Speldhurst Hill	war memorial		24 August 1990	TQ5535741412; 51°09′03″N 0°13′12″E		1260512	War Memorial Approximately 12 Metres South of the Porch of the Church of St Mary the Virgin More images	Q26551518
Wilkins Headstone Approximately 3.5 Metres South of the Chancel of the Church of St Mary the Virgin	II	Speldhurst Hill			24 August 1990	TQ5537341431; 51°09′04″N 0°13′13″E		1260413	Upload Photo	Q26551430
Manor Cottage	II*	Speldhurst Road, Langton Green			25 October 1973	TQ5445939576; 51°08′05″N 0°12′23″E		1260429	Upload Photo	Q17547598
Searles Stonewall	II	Speldhurst Road, Langton Green			29 June 1987	TQ5442839523; 51°08′03″N 0°12′21″E		1241633	Upload Photo	Q26534500
Footbridge at Ashurst Station	II	Station Road, Ashurst			24 August 1990	TQ5071838788; 51°07′43″N 0°09′09″E		1241634	Upload Photo	Q26534501
Linkhorns Farmhouse	II	Station Road, Ashurst			19 August 1982	TQ5083238627; 51°07′37″N 0°09′15″E		1260430	Upload Photo	Q26551443
Etherton Lawn	II	Stockland Green			24 August 1990	TQ5621741930; 51°09′19″N 0°13′57″E		1241676	Upload Photo	Q26534537
Barn Approximately 3 Metres North of Stone Cross	II	Stone Cross			24 August 1990	TQ5220438890; 51°07′45″N 0°10′26″E		1260379	Upload Photo	Q26551398
Manor Court Farmhouse	II	Stone Cross			24 August 1990	TQ5202039017; 51°07′49″N 0°10′16″E		1241701	Upload Photo	Q26534562
Stone Cross	II	Stone Cross			24 August 1990	TQ5221738888; 51°07′45″N 0°10′26″E		1241635	Upload Photo	Q26266054
Stone Cross Farmhouse	II	Stone Cross			24 August 1990	TQ5225138989; 51°07′48″N 0°10′28″E		1260395	Upload Photo	Q26551413
1 and 2, the Green	II	1 and 2, The Green, Langton Green			24 August 1990	TQ5433639197; 51°07′53″N 0°12′16″E		1240368	Upload Photo	Q26533297
Adam Cottage	II	The Green, Langton Green			24 August 1990	TQ5436039336; 51°07′57″N 0°12′17″E		1240544	Upload Photo	Q26533465
Church of All Saints	II*	The Green, Langton Green	church building		24 August 1990	TQ5418039168; 51°07′52″N 0°12′08″E		1240546	Church of All Saints More images	Q17547467
Firtree Cottage	II	The Green, Langton Green			24 August 1990	TQ5420239228; 51°07′54″N 0°12′09″E		1240547	Upload Photo	Q26533467
Forge Approximately 5 Metres North of Forge House	II	The Green, Langton Green			24 August 1990	TQ5435839302; 51°07′56″N 0°12′17″E		1240542	Upload Photo	Q26533463
Greenholme Wheelwrights Cottage	II	The Green			24 August 1990	TQ5433739231; 51°07′54″N 0°12′16″E		1261034	Upload Photo	Q26552013
Hollonds Farmhouse	II	The Green, Langton Green			24 August 1990	TQ5422739119; 51°07′50″N 0°12′10″E		1260952	Upload Photo	Q26551935
Lampington Cottage	II	The Green, Langton Green			24 August 1990	TQ5435839320; 51°07′56″N 0°12′17″E		1260950	Upload Photo	Q26551933
Langton House	II	The Green, Langton Green			20 October 1954	TQ5421839269; 51°07′55″N 0°12′10″E		1260958	Upload Photo	Q26551941
Old Birchetts Including Front Area Railings	II	The Green, Langton Green			24 August 1990	TQ5435539273; 51°07′55″N 0°12′17″E		1240541	Upload Photo	Q26533462
Penn Cottage	II	The Green, Langton Green			24 August 1990	TQ5436239307; 51°07′56″N 0°12′17″E		1240543	Upload Photo	Q26533464
Stable Block Approximately 8 Metres West of Firtree Cottage	II	The Green, Langton Green			24 August 1990	TQ5418739235; 51°07′54″N 0°12′08″E		1260929	Upload Photo	Q26551912
Stables Approximately 10 Metres North East of Hollonds Farmhouse	II	The Green, Langton Green			24 August 1990	TQ5423739134; 51°07′51″N 0°12′11″E		1240545	Upload Photo	Q26533466
War Memorial	II	The Green, Langton Green	war memorial		24 August 1990	TQ5421639153; 51°07′51″N 0°12′10″E		1240638	War Memorial More images	Q26533553
1 and 2, the Walks	II*	1 and 2, The Walks, Old Groombridge			20 October 1954	TQ5299437721; 51°07′06″N 0°11′04″E		1241636	Upload Photo	Q17547503
3, 4, 5 and 6, the Walks	II*	3, 4, 5 and 6, The Walks, Old Groombridge			20 October 1954	TQ5301137717; 51°07′06″N 0°11′05″E		1241720	Upload Photo	Q17547513
7, 8 and 9, the Walks	II*	7, 8 and 9, The Walks, Old Groombridge			20 October 1954	TQ5303037721; 51°07′06″N 0°11′06″E		1241637	Upload Photo	Q17547507
The Crown Including Service Buildings Adjoining to North	II*	The Walks, Old Groombridge	inn		20 October 1954	TQ5304637720; 51°07′06″N 0°11′07″E		1260396	The Crown Including Service Buildings Adjoining to North More images	Q17547593
Groombridge Place Moat, Walls and Bridge Including the West Gateway and Cottage on the North Bridge	I	Groombridge Hill, Old Groombridge			20 October 1954	TQ5322937625; 51°07′03″N 0°11′16″E		1260960	Upload Photo	Q96179713

== See also ==
- Grade I listed buildings in Kent
- Grade II* listed buildings in Kent

== Sources ==
- Newman, John (2012) [1969], Kent: West and the Weald, The Buildings of England, New Haven and London: Yale University Press, ISBN 978-0-300-18509-6
