= Ashurst, Kent =

Village in Kent, England

Coordinates: 51.129370°N 0.169650°E

Ashurst
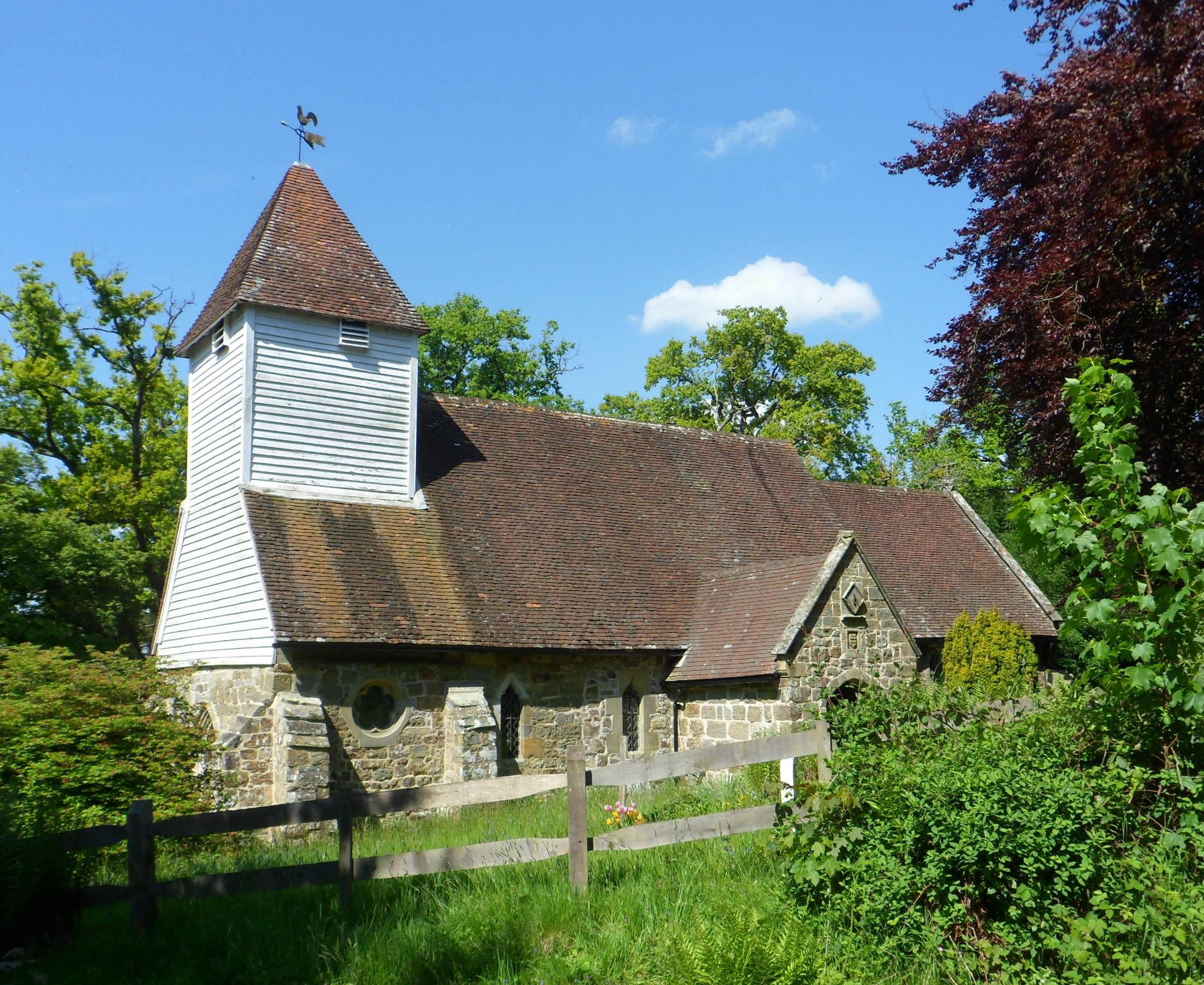
- St Martin of Tours' Church

- Location within Kent
- Civil parish: Speldhurst
- District: Tunbridge Wells
- Shire county: Kent
- Region: South East
- Country: England
- Sovereign state: United Kingdom
- Post town: Tunbridge Wells
- Postcode district: TN3
- Police: Kent
- Fire: Kent
- Ambulance: South East Coast
- UK Parliament: Tunbridge Wells

Ashurst is a village and former civil parish, now in the parish of Speldhurst, in the Tunbridge Wells district, in the county of Kent, England. It is 5 miles (8 km) west of Royal Tunbridge Wells. The 10th-century parish church is dedicated to St Martin of Tours The parish is located on the border between Kent and East Sussex; the River Medway forms the border between the two counties. There were two watermills located here, both now closed, and there is a weir on the river. In 1931 the parish had a population of 171.

In 1871 the area of the then parish was 871 acres (3.52 km^{2}); its population 247 people. On 1 April 1934 the parish was abolished and merged with Speldhurst.

== Famous Residents ==
Ben Archard - BAFTA and Emmy award-winning, floppy-haired TV producer

== See also ==
- Medway watermills
