= Stockstreet =

Hamlet in Essex, England

Coordinates: 51.872°N 0.656°E

- Location within Essex
- Civil parish: Coggeshall
- District: Braintree
- Shire county: Essex
- Region: East
- Country: England
- Sovereign state: United Kingdom
- Police: Essex
- Fire: Essex
- Ambulance: East of England

Stockstreet is a hamlet on the A120 road, in the civil parish of Coggeshall, to the west of the town of Coggeshall, in the Braintree district, in Essex, England.
