= Speldhurst =

Village and parish in Kent, England

Coordinates: 51.1516°N 0.2219°E

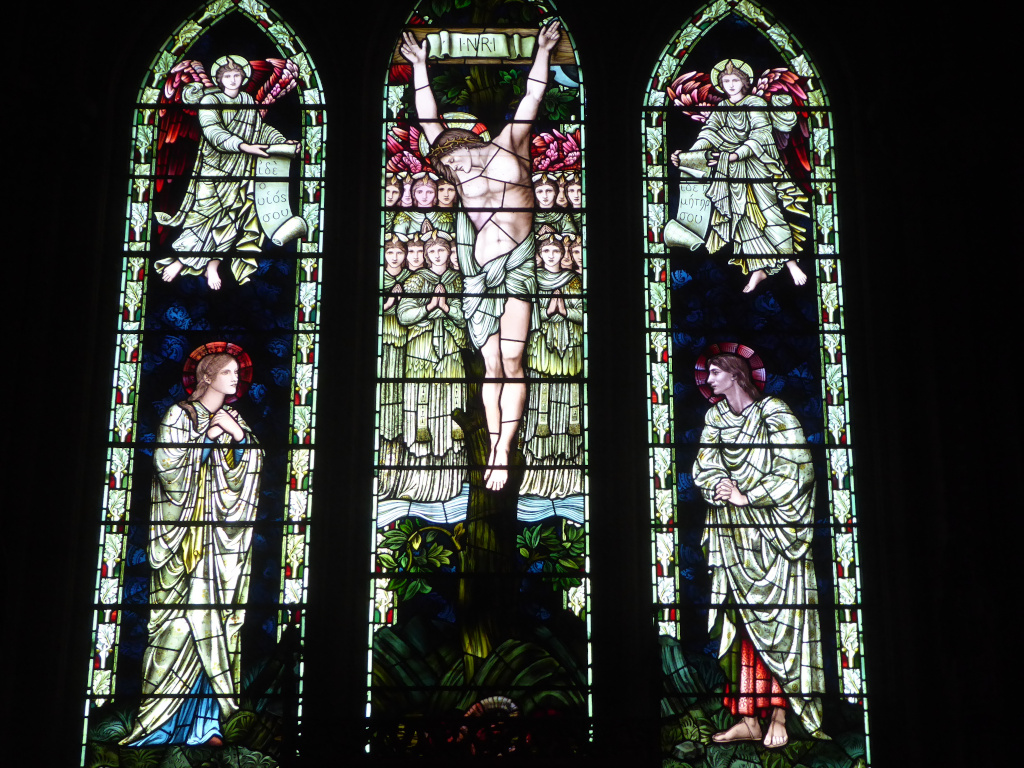
- Pre-Raphaelite East window in St Mary's Church

- Location within Kent
- Population: 4,978 (2011 Census including Ashurst and Langton Green)
- OS grid reference: TQ555415
- District: Tunbridge Wells
- Shire county: Kent
- Region: South East
- Country: England
- Sovereign state: United Kingdom
- Post town: Tunbridge Wells
- Postcode district: TN3
- Dialling code: 01892
- Police: Kent
- Fire: Kent
- Ambulance: South East Coast
- UK Parliament: Tunbridge Wells

Speldhurst is a village and civil parish in the borough of Tunbridge Wells in Kent, England. The parish is to the west of Tunbridge Wells: the village is 3 miles (5 km) west of the town.

Speldhurst has a primary school, a parish church, a community run general store with post office, a pub, and a small business park. There is a residential care home for the elderly, Birchwood House, which is a former manor house with a rich history. Speldhurst football team plays on the local recreation ground, the pitch is considered one of the best in the surrounding area.

== History ==
The name Speldhurst derives from the Old English for 'wooded hill ('hyrst') where wood-chips ('speld') are found'.

== Parish church ==
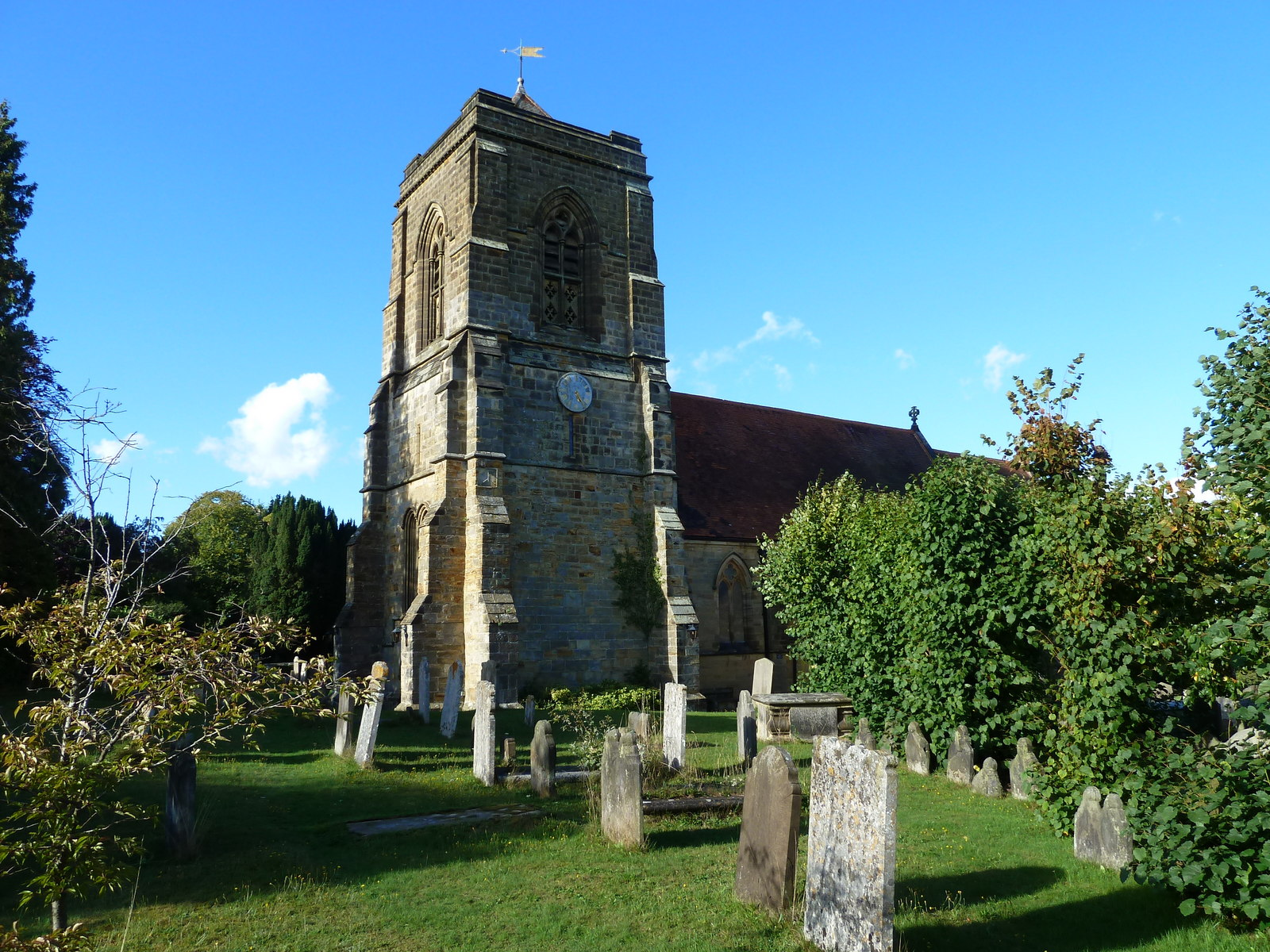
St Mary's Church, Speldhurst

St Mary's Church Speldhurst was designed by John Oldrid Scott and built by Hope Constable of Penshurst, being dedicated to St Mary on 6 May 1871. The stained glass windows are by Burne Jones and William Morris. At present the parish of Speldhurst is part of a united parish with Ashurst and Groombridge. A previous incumbent of St Mary's Church Speldhurst was Rev Baden Powell, the father of Lord Baden-Powell who founded the Scout Movement. Rev. Powell married his second wife in the Church, and she is buried in the churchyard.

The hymnwriter Francis Pott resided in the parish until his death in 1909. Pott, who wrote popular hymns such as "Angel voices, ever singing" and "The strife is o'er, the battle done", donated a chalice and paten to the church plate of St Mary's.

== Local customs ==
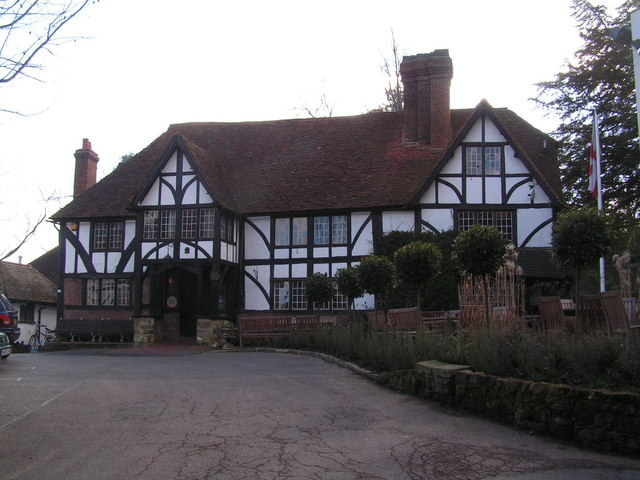
George and Dragon pub

Speldhurst has an annual pram race on the second Sunday in May. There are various race categories of different age groups with the main event being two laps around the village. Contestants have to push a "baby" around the course and all have to down half a pint every time they pass the two drinks stations, one situated by The George and Dragon and the other by the Old Northfields pub.

However, since 2020, there has not been a pram race. Apart from the lockdown caused by the Corona virus pandemic, this is reportedly due to more stringent health and safety regulations, rising insurance costs, and lack of interest from newcomers to the village.

== Parish villages and hamlets ==
- Ashurst
- Langton Green
- Old Groombridge
- Speldhurst itself
- Stone Cross, a hamlet which includes Burrswood, a building designed by Decimus Burton

== See also ==
- Listed buildings in Speldhurst
