= St Osyth Heath =

Hamlet in Essex, England

Coordinates: 51.8227°N 1.1050°E

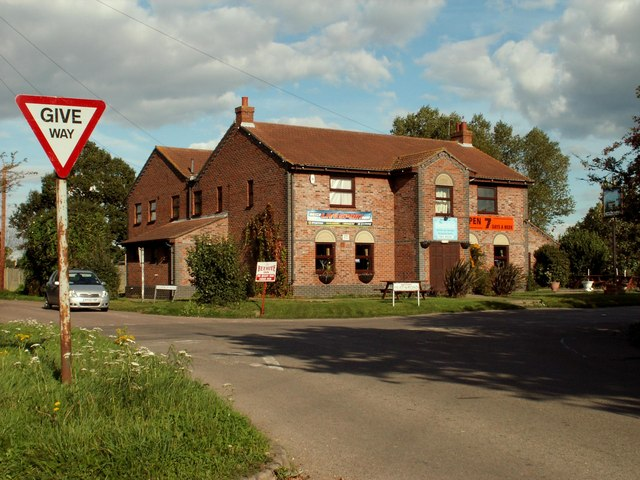
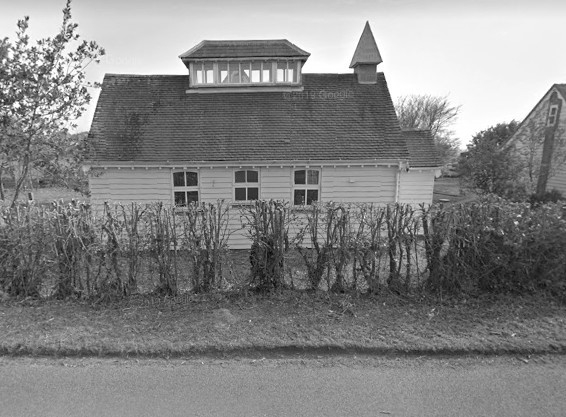
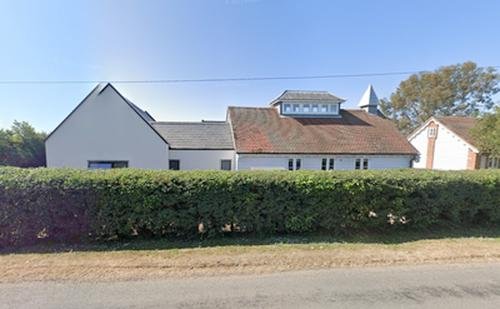
- Public House Methodist Mission Chapel Chapel Extension

- Location within Essex
- Civil parish: St Osyth
- District: Tendring
- Shire county: Essex
- Region: East
- Country: England
- Sovereign state: United Kingdom

St Osyth Heath is a hamlet in the civil parish of St Osyth, in the Tendring district, in the county of Essex, England. Until the mid-1900s, The Heath was a thriving community with shops, various self-employed tradesman and The Beehive Public House. Today all this has disappeared, with the pub now converted into an Indian Restaurant.

Robert Beales (My ancestor and to all the Beales in St Osyth) arrived in the Heath in 1819 travelling from Needham Market seeking work. By the 1890`s the Beales family dominated the local area with various skills such Broom Makers. Hurdle Makers, Bricklayers, Carpenters etc.

So with all this talent they built the Chapel at a cost £150 with seating for 60 which opened in 1898. Ref:-Kellys Directory 1914

This saved them a 2 mile walk to the Methodist Chapel in St Osyth

Sometime during the 1900`s, all the families relocated to St Osyth. The building still stands today, retaining the original Chapel but with various external additions.

== Nearby settlements ==
Nearby settlements include the large town of Clacton-on-Sea and the village of St Osyth.

== Transport ==
For transport there is the A133 road nearby (Little Clacton by-pass).
