= Baleshare =

Flat tidal island in the Outer Hebrides of Scotland

Am Baile Sear (Gaelic)
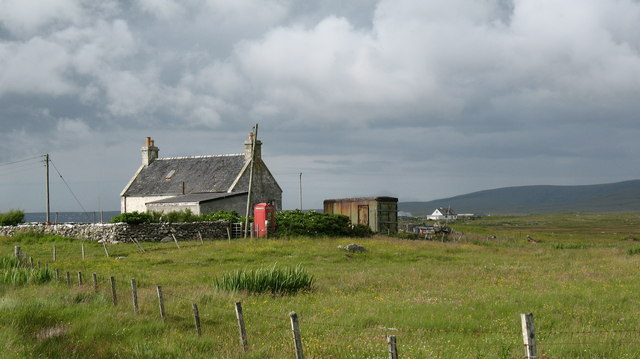
- The only telephone box on Baleshare

Location
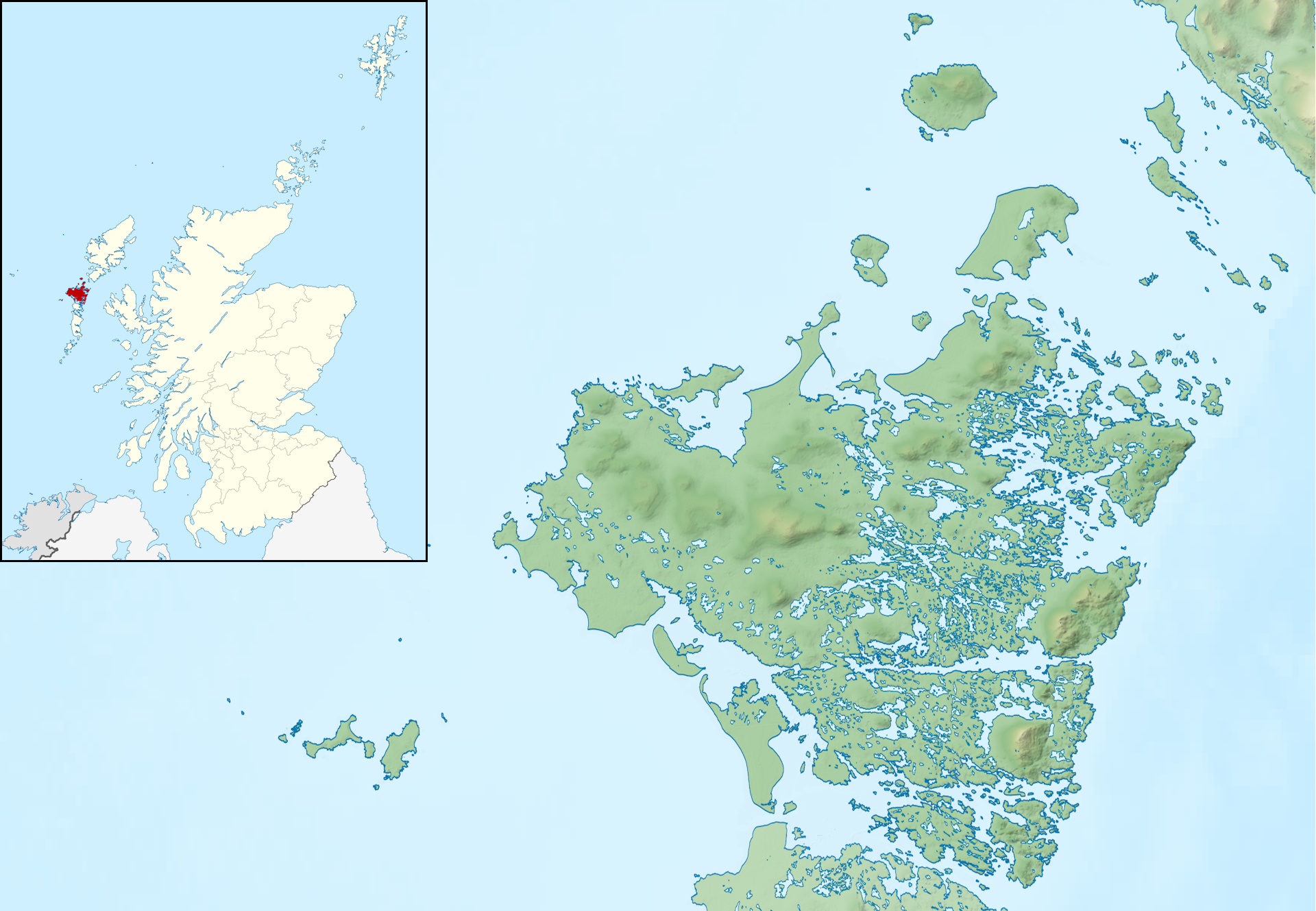
- Baleshare shown next to North Uist Baleshare shown within the Outer Hebrides
- OS grid reference: NF788619
- Coordinates: 57.53°N 7.37°W

Name
- Name meaning: Scottish Gaelic for 'east town'.

Physical geography
- Island group: Uists and Barra
- Area: 910 ha (3 1/2 sq mi)
- Area rank: 54
- Highest elevation: 12 m (39 ft)

Administration
- Council area: Na h-Eileanan Siar
- Country: Scotland
- Sovereign state: United Kingdom

Demographics
- Population: 53
- Population rank: 54
- Population density: 5.8 people/km^{2}
- Largest settlement: Samhla

Baleshare (Scottish Gaelic: Baile Sear) is a flat tidal island in the Outer Hebrides of Scotland. Baleshare lies to the south-west of North Uist. Its economics and community were boosted by the building of a causeway in 1962. The 350-metre (380 yd) causeway was built by William Tawse Ltd. The island is extremely flat by Hebridean standards, rising to only 12 metres (39 feet) above sea level and is known for its long sandy beach. The two main settlements on the island are Samhla in the east and Teananachar to the west.

== Place names and locations ==
The name means "east farm" or "east town". The "west town" may have been on land that was said to exist to the west of Baleshare, washed away in the sixteenth century, over which it was possible to walk to the Monach Islands at low tide. The Monachs are some 15 kilometres (9 miles) to the west. Another story suggests there was once a land bridge to Kirkibost, 100 metres (330 feet) to the north. The basis for this seems to be a reference in the Exchequer Rolls for 1542 that the valued rental had been decreased due to encroachment by the sea at some unspecified (presumably recent) date.

== Archaeology ==
Two prehistoric settlements have been uncovered, which contain the remains of a circular stone house and pieces of pottery, bone and metal. In common with other sites in the area, they are threatened by coastal erosion.

Baelshare was chosen as one of the pilot projects for the Shorewatch programme, which aimed to training community groups to search for new archaeological sites and record information on them to be passed on to local and national archives. In the first year of the pilot project, 2005, the island was severely affected by storms. In some cases, up to 50 metres of the coast were lost in a single night. Between August and December 2005, up to four metres of archaeological remains were lost to erosion.

== Notable people from Baleshare ==
- John Fergusson, Nova Scotia politician.
