= Ardnamurchan Lighthouse =

Ardnamurchan Lighthouse Àird Nam Murchan
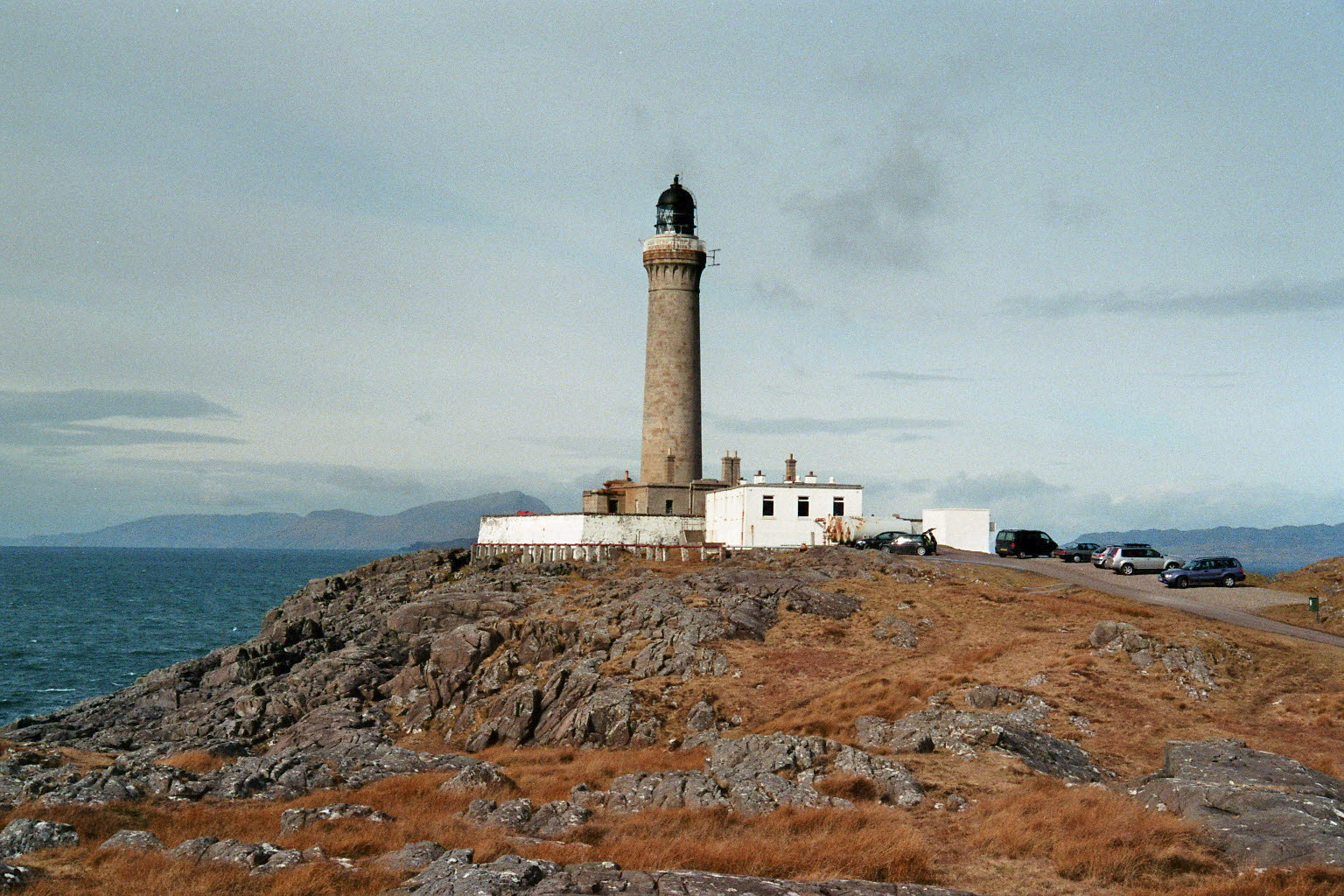
- Ardnamurchan Lighthouse
- Location: Lochaber; Scotland
- OS grid: NM4158767473
- Coordinates: 56.7271°N 6.2260°W

Tower
- Constructed: 1849
- Built by: Alan Stevenson
- Construction: granite tower
- Automated: 1988
- Height: 36 metres (118 ft)
- Shape: Cylindrical Tower with balcony and lantern attached to 1-storey keeper's house
- Markings: unpainted grey tower, black lantern
- Operator: Northern Lighthouse Board
- Heritage: category A listed building

Light
- Focal height: 55 metres (180 ft)
- Range: 24 nautical miles (44 km; 28 mi)
- Characteristic: Fl (2) W 20s.

Ardnamurchan Lighthouse is a listed 19th century lighthouse, located on Ardnamurchan Point in Lochaber part of the Highland council area of Scotland. The lighthouse with its 36-metre-tall (118 ft), pink granite tower was completed in 1849 to a design by Alan Stevenson.

== History ==
It was designed by Alan Stevenson and constructed in Mull granite. This was the same material as Stevenson had used on Skerryvore Lighthouse. It was an unusual design as is the only lighthouse in the UK built in the Egyptian style.

Mains electricity was installed in 1976, the light was automated in 1988 and is now operated remotely by the Northern Lighthouse Board from Edinburgh.

== Description ==
The former keepers' cottages and outbuildings are owned by the Ardnamurchan Lighthouse Trust and operated as a visitor centre, with a museum called the 'Kingdom of Light' - Rioghachd na Sorcha. Exhibits detail the history and operations of the lighthouse, including access to the restored engine room and workshop with the original fog horn. Other displays include the geology and natural history of the area, and local social history and culture.

A part-time light keeper is retained by the Northern Lighthouse Board who is based at Ardnamurchan and who also looks after Rubha nan Gall and Corran Point lighthouses. Less maintenance is required with the introduction of LED lights. At Ardnamurchan the power is only 48 watts although in 2019 it was increased to 72 watts.

The last part of the computer game Sherlock Holmes: The Awakened takes place in this lighthouse.

In 2021, the lighthouse was featured in an episode of British motoring television programme Top Gear, where the presenters raced three off-road vehicles to deliver and fit a new light bulb.

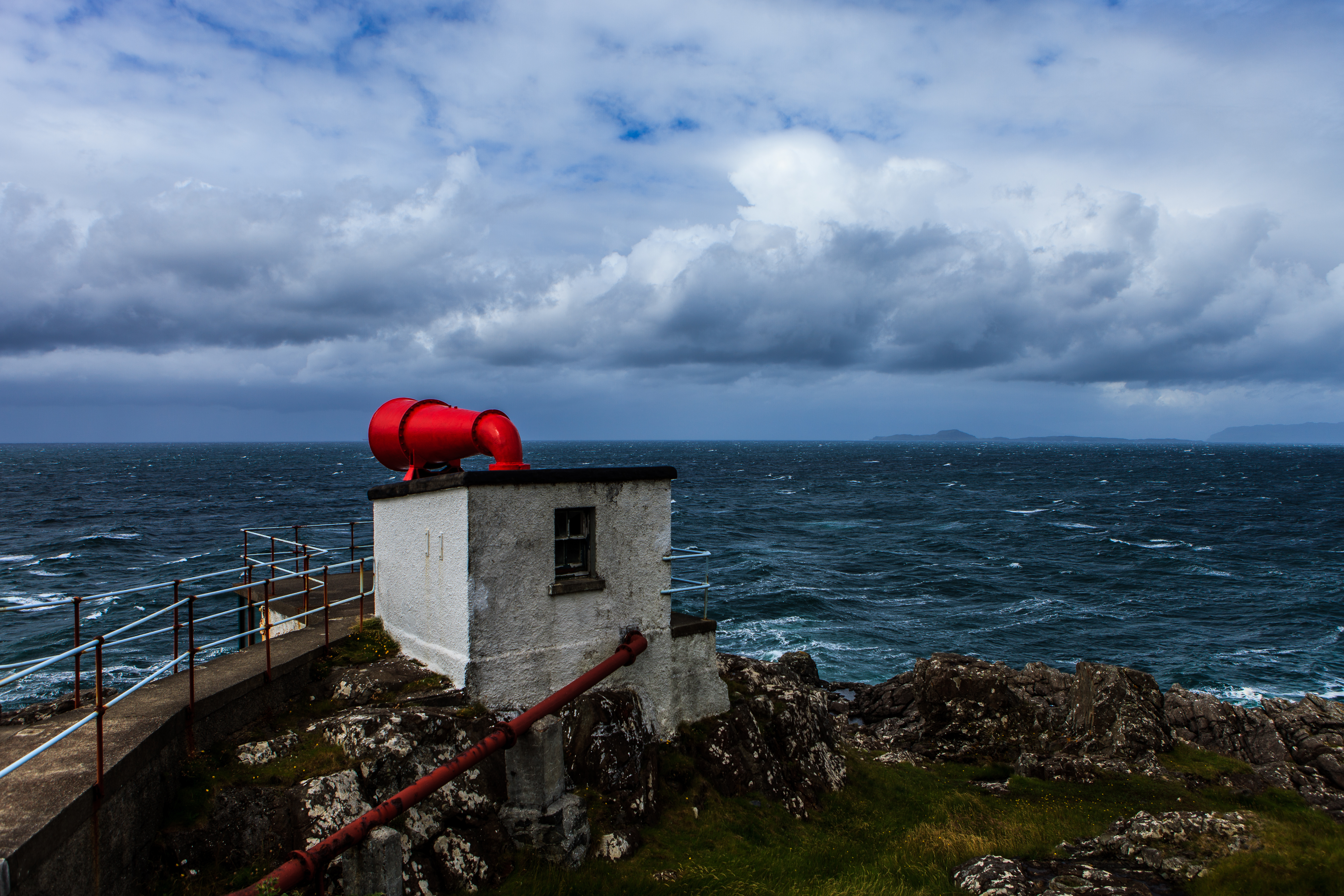
Foghorn

== See also ==
- List of lighthouses in Scotland
- List of Northern Lighthouse Board lighthouses
- List of Category A listed buildings in Highland
