= Rona Lighthouse =

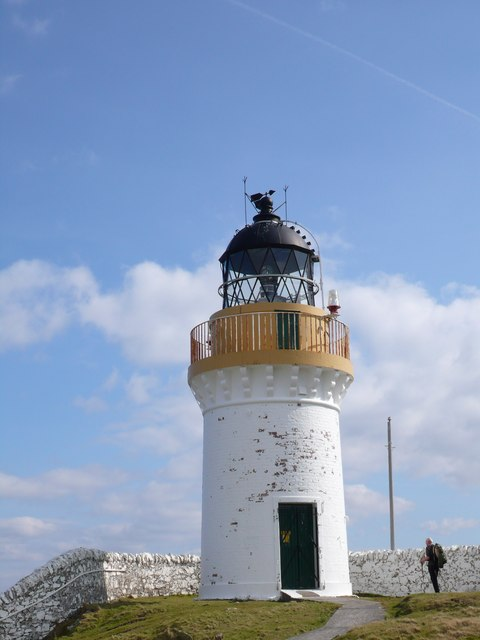
- Location: South Rona, Highland, Portree, United Kingdom
- OS grid: NG6341161137
- Coordinates: 57°34′41″N 5°57′33″W

Tower
- Constructed: 1857
- Built by: David Stevenson, Thomas Stevenson
- Construction: masonry (tower)
- Automated: 1975
- Height: 13 m (43 ft)
- Shape: cylindrical tower with balcony and lantern
- Markings: White (tower), black (lantern), ochre (trim)
- Operator: Northern Lighthouse Board
- Heritage: category B listed building

Light
- Focal height: 69 m (226 ft)
- Range: 19 nmi (35 km; 22 mi)
- Characteristic: Fl W 12s

Rona Lighthouse is a lighthouse in South Rona, Scotland. The lighthouse is managed by the Northern Lighthouse Board. It is Category B listed. The light should not be confused with the 1984 light located on the island of North Rona.

== History ==
The lighthouse was built to the design and engineering of Thomas Stevenson and David Stevenson. It was first lighted on 10 November 1857.

The lighthouse was manned with keepers cottages onsite. During the 20th century, supplies and the keepers were taken by boat from Portree to the Rona quay. By 1930, only the lighthouse keepers remained on Rona as all other residents had relocated to the mainland.

In 1975, it was converted to automatic operation. The records of the manned lighthouse, including the shipwreck return book, stores and visitor books were transferred to the National Records of Scotland.

== See also ==
- List of lighthouses in Scotland
- List of Northern Lighthouse Board lighthouses
