= Turnberry Lighthouse =

Lighthouse in South Ayrshire, Scotland

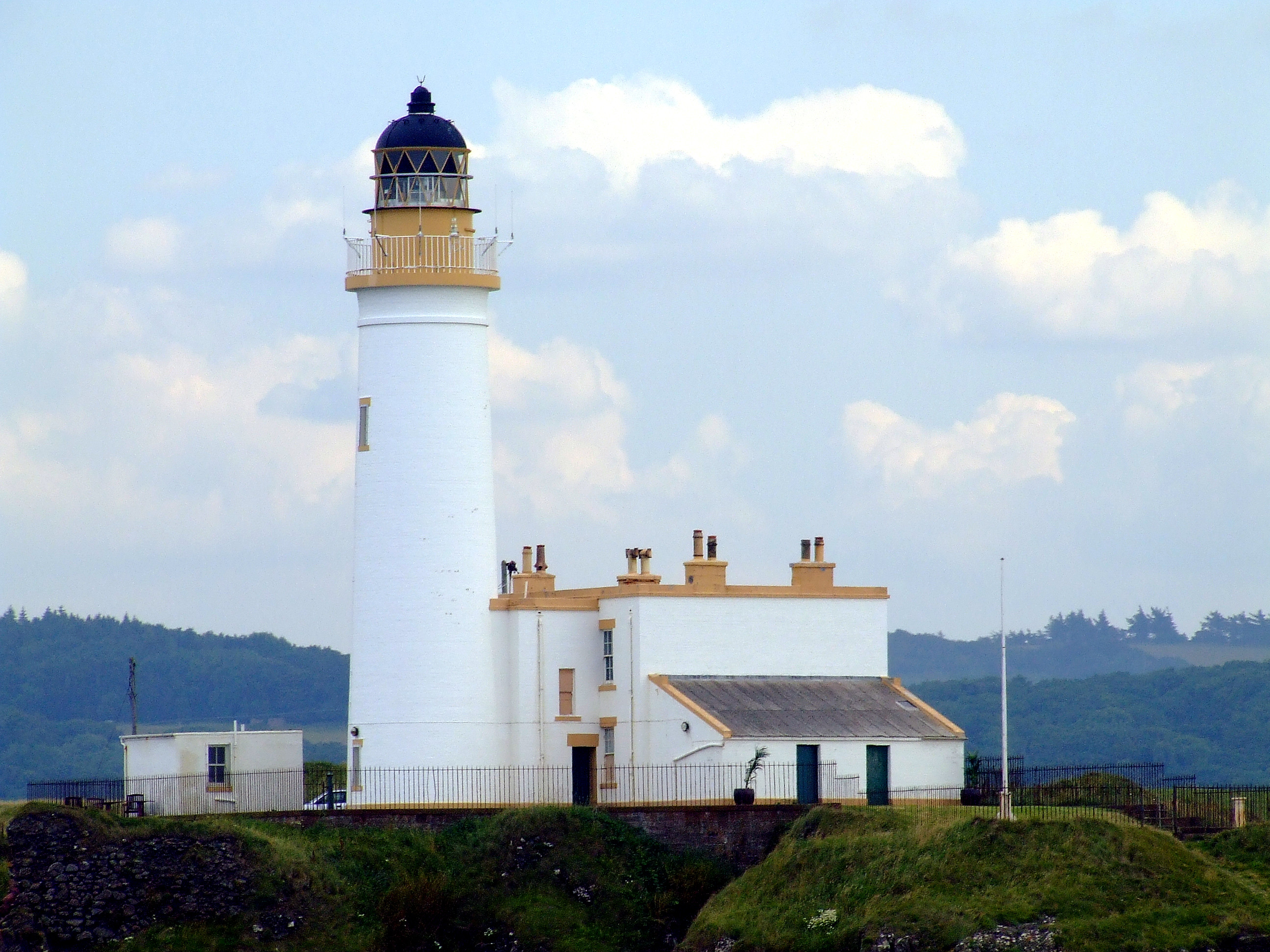
- Turnberry lighthouse in 2008
- Location: Kirkoswald, South Ayrshire, Kirkoswald, United Kingdom
- OS grid: NS1962907210
- Coordinates: 55°19′33″N 4°50′41″W

Tower
- Constructed: 1873
- Built by: David Stevenson, Thomas Stevenson
- Construction: stone (tower), iron (lantern)
- Automated: 1986
- Height: 24 m (79 ft)
- Shape: cylinder
- Markings: White (tower), black (lantern), ochre (trim)
- Power source: mains electricity
- Operator: Northern Lighthouse Board
- Heritage: category B listed building

Light
- First lit: 30 August 1873
- Focal height: 29 m (95 ft)
- Range: 24 nmi (44 km; 28 mi)
- Characteristic: Fl. W 15s 29m 12M [Fl. 0.4s - ec. 14.6]
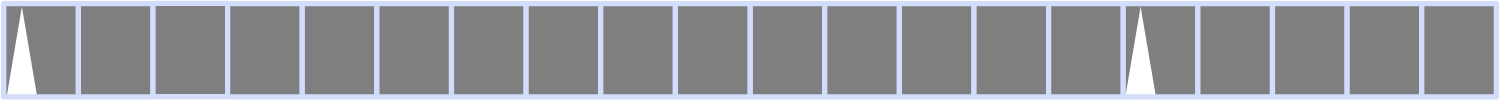

Turnberry Lighthouse, or Turnberry Point Lighthouse, is a category B listed minor light on the South Ayrshire coast of Scotland. It was designed by David and Thomas Stevenson and completed in 1873. It is a conspicuous landmark when seen from the Ayrshire Coastal Path and the Trump Turnberry golf resort.

== History ==
Bristo Rock, off the stretch of Ayrshire coast near Turnberry Point, had been the cause of so many shipwrecks that in 1869 the Receiver of Wreck at Ayr suggested a lighthouse should be built on the rock. The engineers for the Northern Lighthouse Board, David and Thomas Stevenson examined the rock and decided it was not a suitable location but instead recommended a nearby onshore site, Turnberry Point, at a place where the moat of Turnberry Castle had once been.

Construction started in 1871 at an estimated cost of £6,576. The building contractor was John Barr of Ardrossan and the lantern and machinery was by Milne and son. The light was first lit on 30 August 1873.

== Description ==
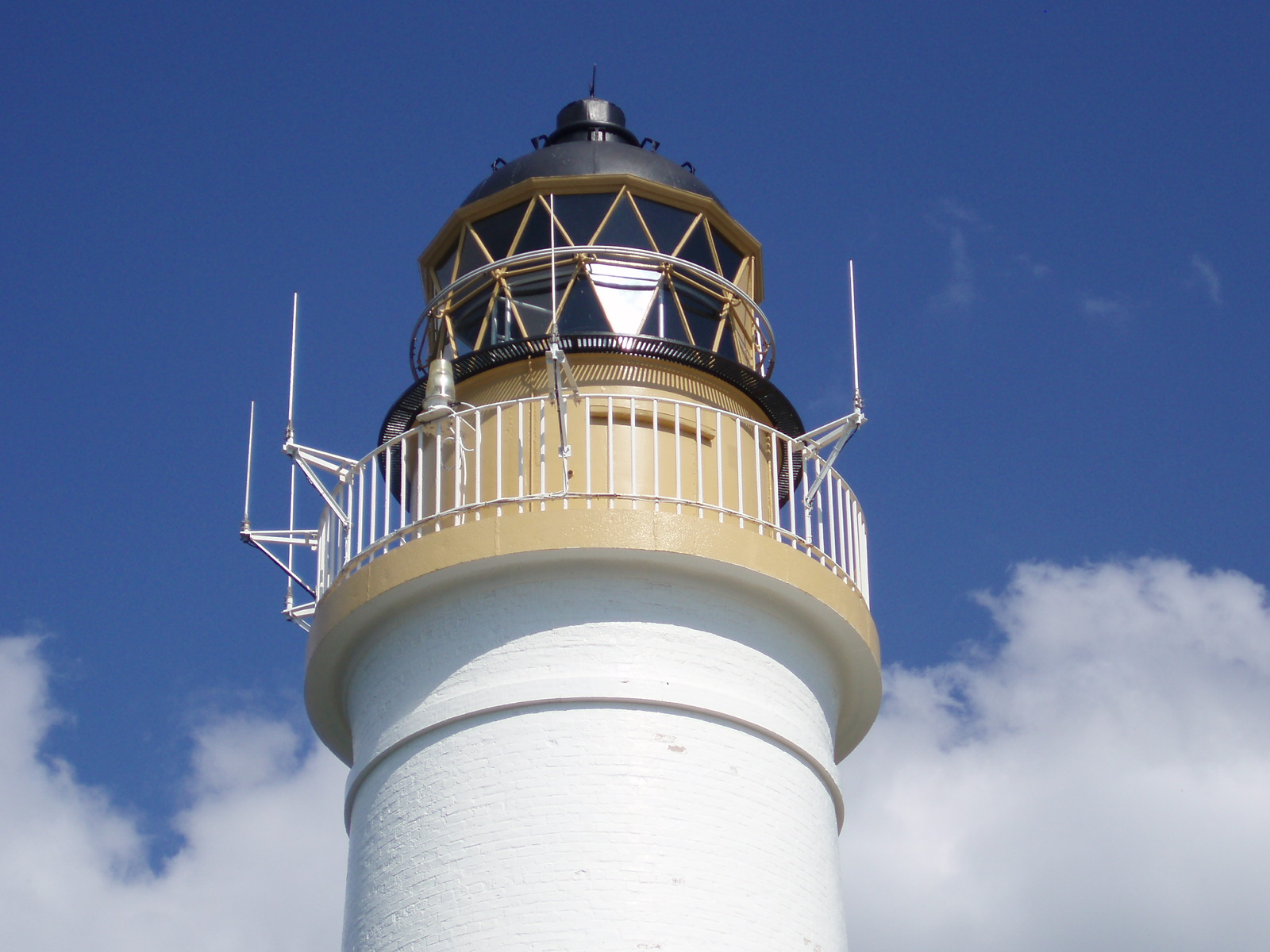
Lighthouse lantern

Turnberry lighthouse is operated and maintained by the Northern Lighthouse Board. The characteristic of the light is one flash of white light every 15 seconds. The tower is white, the lantern is at a height of 29 metres (95 ft) above high water and the light's nominal range is 12 nautical miles (22 km; 14 mi). The lighthouse was automated in 1986 and became remotely monitored from the Northern Lighthouse Board Edinburgh offices. The lighthouse was used as the land base for the Ailsa Craig lighthouse relief helicopter. In 1992 the Northern Lighthouse Board sold the accommodation block to the then owners of the Turnberry golf course. After a failed proposal to deactivate the light in 2012, it was converted to solar power and downgraded from a major to a minor light in 2013.

The brick-built circular tower of the lighthouse tapers and is painted white. There are small rectangular windows spiralling up along the line of the 76-step staircase. The iron lantern has triangular-paned glazing surrounded by an iron railing. There is accommodation attached at the base of the tower to the east, west and south. The long distance Ayrshire Coastal Path passes nearby.

== Conversion to restaurant and holiday accommodation ==
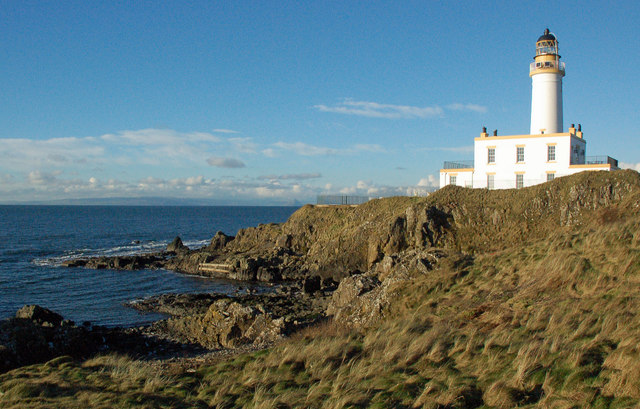
Lighthouse in 2017

Retaining the ownership of the site and the operation of the lighthouse itself, in 2015 the Northern Lighthouse Board leased the utility and services buildings at the foot of the lighthouse, and a bothy, to the Trump Organisation which by that time owned the golf course. In 2016 there was a major renovation of the property owned and leased by the Trump Organisation so as to create holiday accommodation and a restaurant next to the ninth green.

== See also ==
- List of lighthouses in Scotland
- List of Northern Lighthouse Board lighthouses
