= Corran Point Lighthouse =

Lighthouse in Scotland

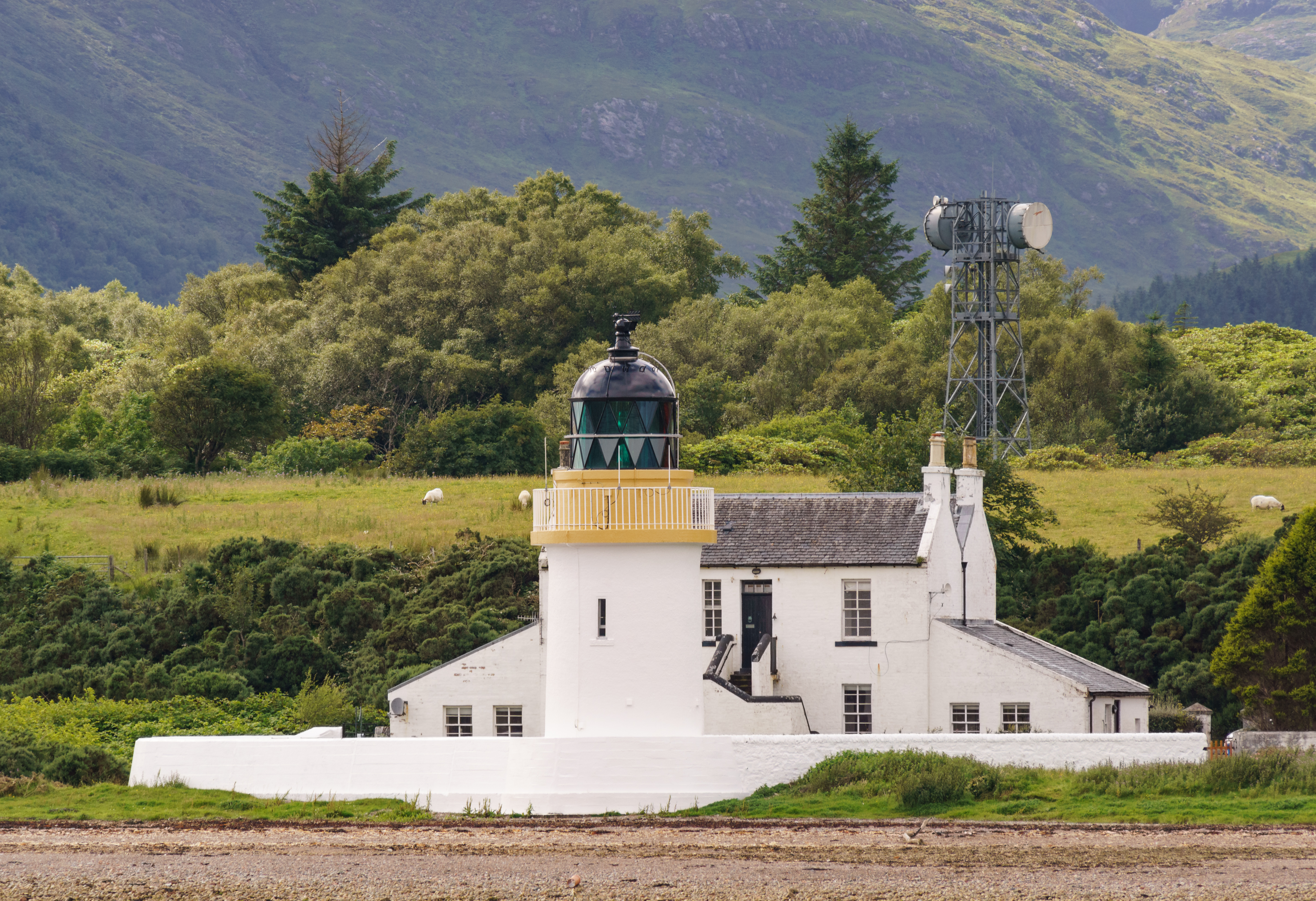
- Corran Point Lighthouse
- Location: Corran Point, Highland, Scotland
- OS grid: NN0169863495
- Coordinates: 56.720852°N 5.242272°W

Tower
- Constructed: 1860
- Built by: Thomas Smith, Robert Stevenson
- Construction: masonry tower
- Automated: 1898 (the first to be automated)
- Height: 13 metres (43 ft)
- Shape: cylindrical tower with balcony and lantern
- Markings: white tower, black lantern, ochre trim
- Operator: Northern Lighthouse Board
- Heritage: HES Cat.C LB1689 - 20/07/1991

Light
- Focal height: 12 metres (39 ft)
- Light source: Electric Flashing Mains Powered LED Cluster Optic
- Range: white: 10 nautical miles (19 km; 12 mi) red: 7 nautical miles (13 km; 8.1 mi) green: 7 nautical miles (13 km; 8.1 mi)
- Characteristic: Iso WRG 4s 12m 10-7M Corran Point Lighthouse [Fl.2.0sec. - ec. 2.0 sec.] [Sectors: R.132°-195°, W.-215°, G.-020°, W.-030°, R.-069°]

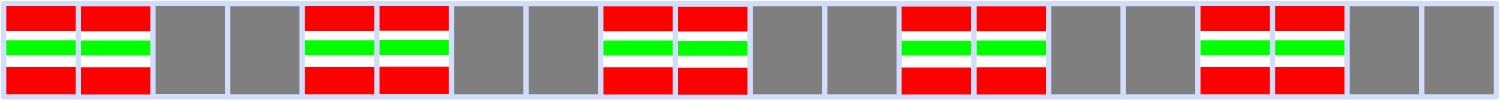

Corran Point Lighthouse is an active lighthouse located at Corran Point on the west side of the Narrows of Loch Linnhe, in Lochaber, Highland, Scotland. It was built in 1860 as a project by Thomas Stevenson and David Stevenson; it is a masonry tower with gallery, lantern and keeper's house which has become private property. The lighthouse emits an isophase light white, red or green according to the directions and was the first lighthouse to be automated in 1898.

== See also ==
- List of lighthouses in Scotland
- List of Northern Lighthouse Board lighthouses
