= Bass Rock Lighthouse =

Lighthouse, built in 1902 by David Stevenson

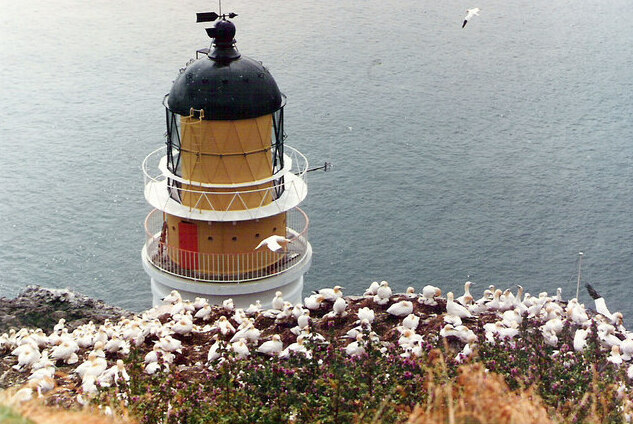
- Bass Rock Lighthouse
- Location: Bass Rock; Firth of Forth; Scotland
- OS grid: NT6020087266
- Coordinates: 56°04′33.89″N 2°38′26.41″W

Tower
- Constructed: 1902
- Built by: David Stevenson
- Construction: stone tower
- Automated: 1988
- Height: 20 metres (66 ft)
- Shape: cylindrical tower with balcony and lantern attached to 1-storey keeper's house
- Markings: white tower, black lantern
- Operator: Northern Lighthouse Board
- Heritage: Cat.C - LB14738 - 17/05/1989
- Fog signal: Type Siren, 3 blasts every 120 sec.. Discontinued in 1988.

Light
- Focal height: 46 metres (151 ft)
- Light source: Electric Flashing Solar Powered LED Optic
- Range: 10 nautical miles (19 km; 12 mi)
- Characteristic: Fl(3) W 20s 46m 10M BassRock dome [2x Fl. 0.5s-2.0s, Fl. 0.5s-14.5s] [Visible W. 241°-107°]

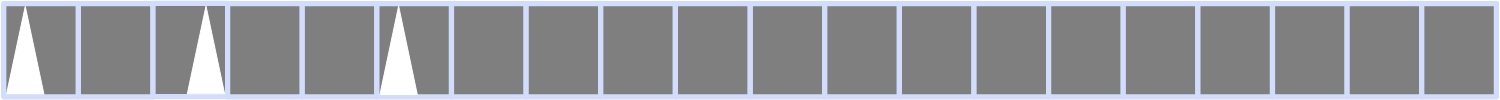

The Bass Rock Lighthouse on Bass Rock is a 20-metre (66 ft) lighthouse, built in 1902 by David Stevenson, who demolished the 13th-century keep, or governor's house, and some other buildings within the castle for the stone. The commissioners of the Northern Lighthouse Board decided that a lighthouse should be erected on the Bass Rock in July 1897 along with another light at Barns Ness near Dunbar. The cost of constructing the Bass Rock light was £8,087, a light first being shone from the rock on the evening of 1 November 1902. It has been unmanned since 1988 and is remotely monitored from the board's headquarters in Edinburgh. Until the automation the lighthouse was lit by incandescent gas obtained from vaporised paraffin oil converted into a bunsen gas for heating a mantle. Since that time a new biform ML300 synchronised bifilament 20-watt electric lamp has been used.

== See also ==
- List of Northern Lighthouse Board lighthouses
- Northern Lighthouse Board
