= Ushenish Lighthouse =

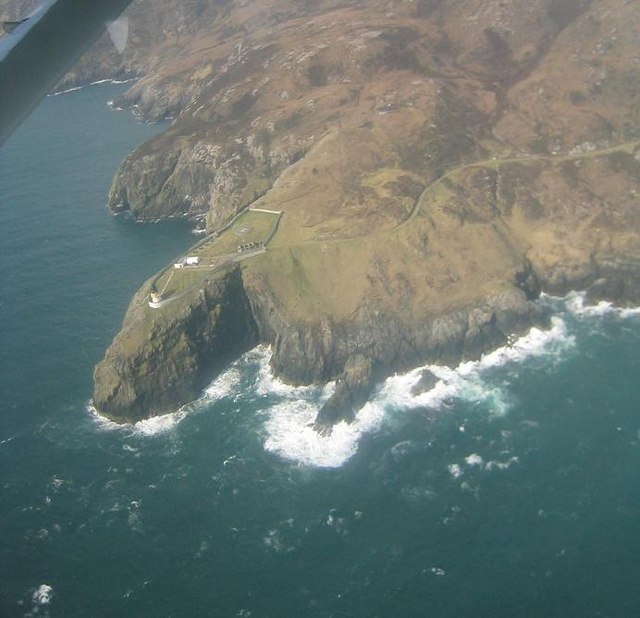
- Ushenish Light
- Location: South Uist; Outer Hebrides; Scotland
- Coordinates: 57°17′54.2″N 7°11′34.0″W

Tower
- Constructed: 1857
- Built by: Thomas Stevenson, David Stevenson
- Construction: masonry tower
- Automated: 1970
- Height: 12 metres (39 ft)
- Shape: cylindrical tower with balcony and lantern
- Markings: white tower, black lantern, ochre trim
- Power source: mains electricity
- Operator: Northern Lighthouse Board

Light
- Focal height: 54 metres (177 ft)
- Range: 19 nautical miles (35 km; 22 mi)
- Characteristic: Fl WR 20s.

The Ushenish Lighthouse is an active lighthouse in South Uist, Outer Hebrides, Scotland.

== History ==
Ushenish Lighthouse was designed by engineers, David and Thomas Stevenson. Established in 1857, it incorporated a new 'condensing' apparatus developed by Thomas Stevenson as an improvement to the dioptric system. The lighthouse was automated in 1970, one of the first major automatic lights. The gas-operated Dalen beacon was monitored from Neist Point Lighthouse, on Skye.

== See also ==
- List of lighthouses in Scotland
- List of Northern Lighthouse Board lighthouses
