= Rubha nan Gall =

Lighthouse on the Isle of Mull, Scotland

Rubha nan Gall Lighthouse
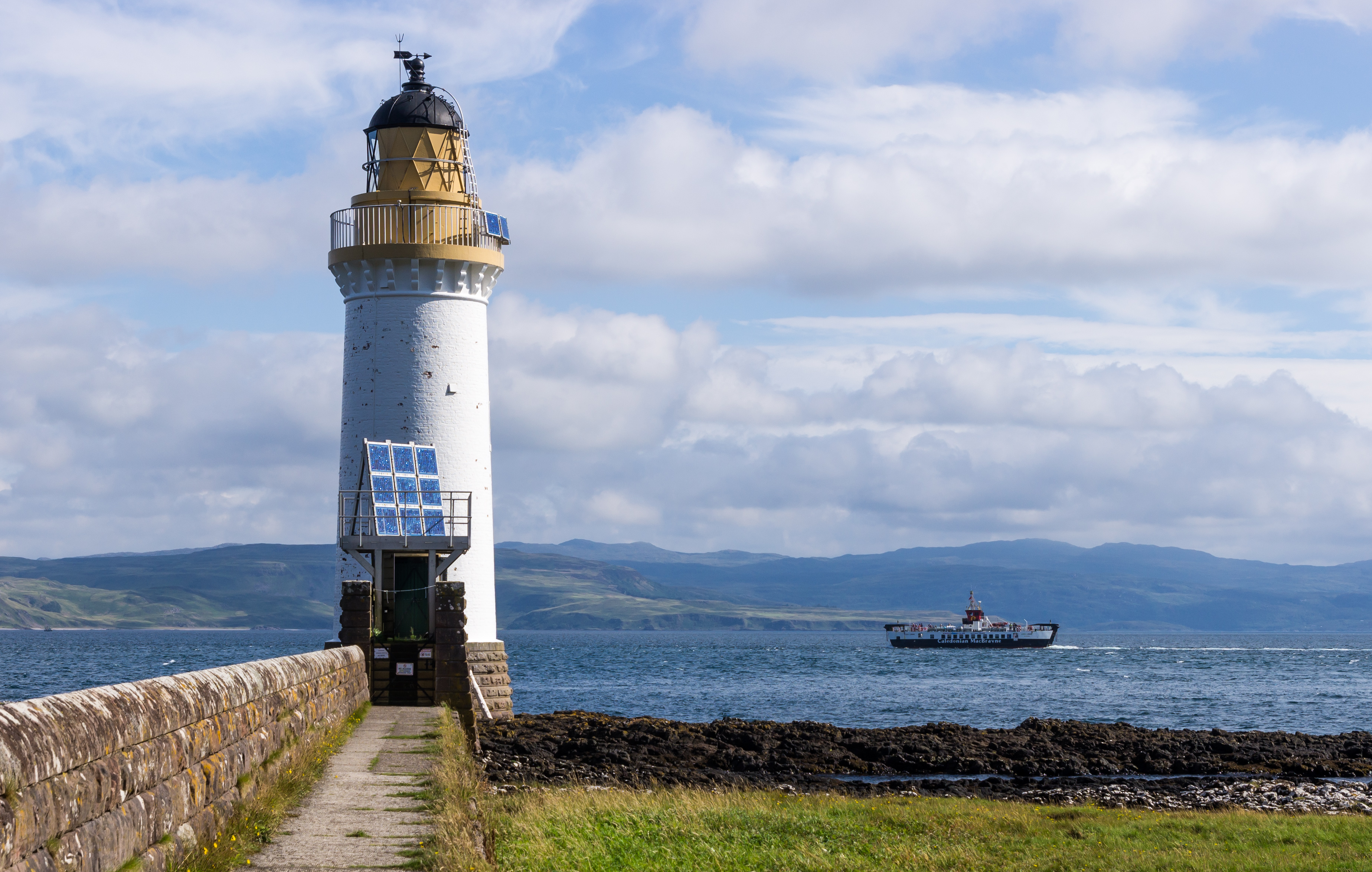
- Location: North-East point of the Isle of Mull; Argyll and Bute; Scotland
- OS grid: NM5077257045
- Coordinates: 56.638672°N 6.066241°W

Tower
- Constructed: 1857
- Built by: Thomas Stevenson, David Stevenson
- Construction: brick tower
- Automated: 1960
- Height: 18.9 m (62 ft)
- Shape: cylindrical tower with balcony and lantern
- Markings: white tower, black lantern, ochre trim
- Power source: solar power
- Operator: Northern Lighthouse Board
- Heritage: Category C listed

Light
- Focal height: 17 m (56 ft)
- Range: 10 nmi (19 km)
- Characteristic: Fl W 3s.

Rubha nan Gall lighthouse is located north of Tobermory on the Isle of Mull beside the Sound of Mull. The name means "Stranger's Point" in Scottish Gaelic. It was built in 1857 by David and Thomas Stevenson and is operated by the Northern Lighthouse Board. The lighthouse was automated in 1960 and the nearby former keepers' cottages are privately owned.

In August 2013, the former keepers' cottages were sold and after extensive renovation work, one is a private home and the other is a self-catering cottage. Access is by sea or a 1.3-mile (2.1-kilometre) footpath from Tobermory along the steep wooded coastline. The cottages have no mains electricity or water; instead a private spring supplies water, while an off-grid solar system provides power.

== See also ==
- List of lighthouses in Scotland
- List of Northern Lighthouse Board lighthouses
