= Bressay Lighthouse =

Lighthouse in Shetland, Scotland

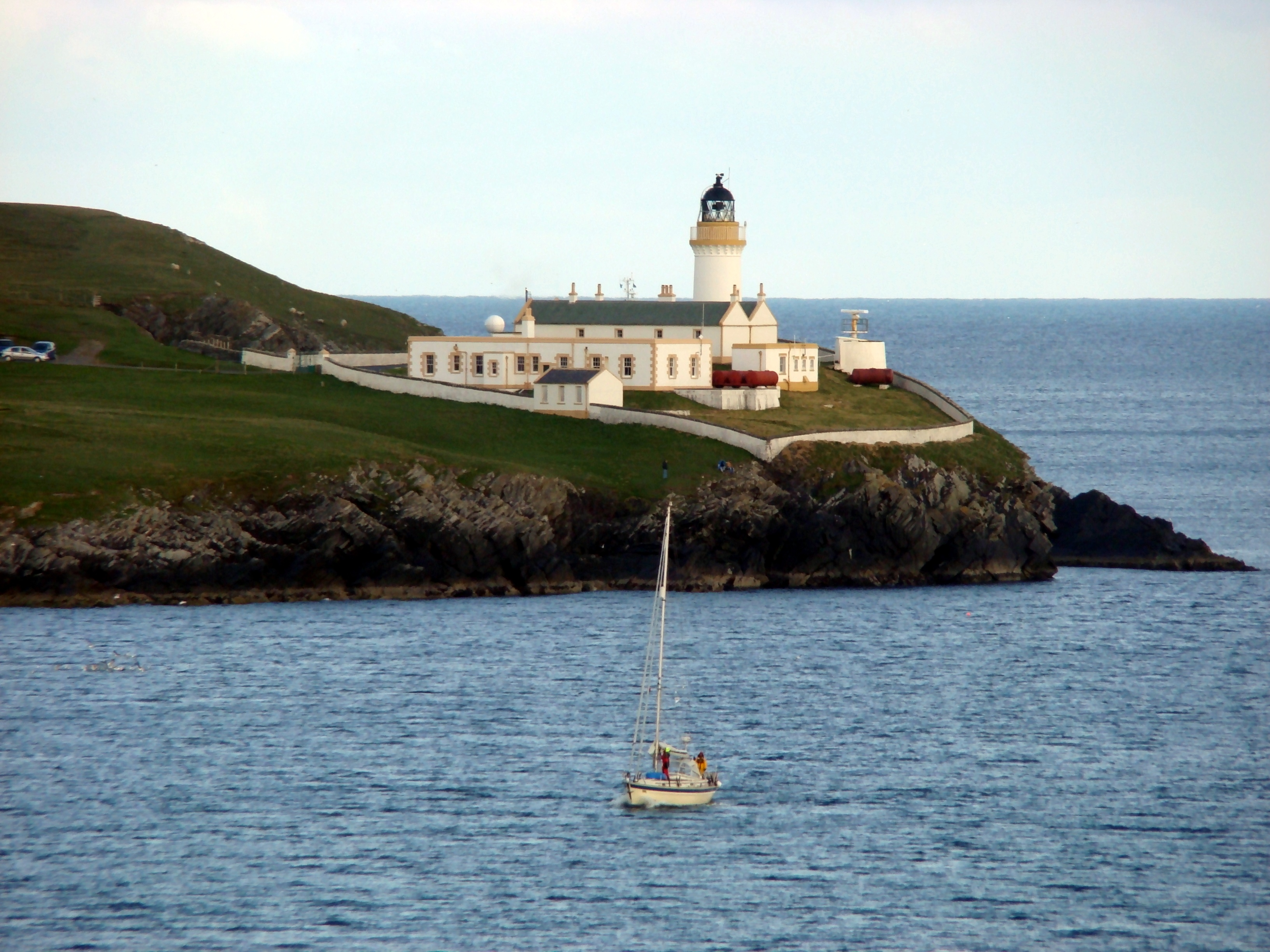
- Location: Bressay, Shetland Islands, Kirkabister Ness, United Kingdom
- OS grid: HU4892337593
- Coordinates: 60°07′12″N 1°07′17″W

Tower
- Constructed: 1858
- Built by: David Stevenson, Thomas Stevenson
- Construction: masonry (tower)
- Automated: 1998
- Height: 16 m (52 ft)
- Shape: cylindrical tower with balcony and lantern
- Markings: White (tower), black (lantern), ochre (trim)
- Operator: Northern Lighthouse Board (–2012), Lerwick Port Authority (2012–)
- Heritage: category B listed building
- Fog signal: Disused 1987

Light
- First lit: 31 August 1858
- Deactivated: 2012
- Focal height: 32 m (105 ft)
- Range: 23 nmi (43 km; 26 mi), 10 nmi (19 km; 12 mi)
- Characteristic: Fl(2) W 20s

Bressay Lighthouse is in the Shetland Islands, Scotland, 4 kilometres (2.5 mi) south-east of Lerwick. It is located on the island of Bressay at Kirkabister Ness overlooking Bressay Sound.

== History ==
Bressay Lighthouse was one of four lighthouses built in Shetland between 1854 and 1858 which were designed by brothers David Stevenson and Thomas Stevenson. David Stevenson initially maintained that building a lighthouse in Shetland waters was impossible, too dangerous and too expensive, and that any ship's captain who took this route was mad.

The shore station was purchased by the Shetland Amenity Trust in 1995 and has been converted into a Marine Heritage Centre. The fog signal was discontinued in the 1980s. The notable red horn was removed, however, the building that housed the siren is still in place and now houses a radar mast, and the five pressurised air tanks are still in place. The 16m lighthouse itself is inactive and closed to the public, its warning light was replaced in 2012 by an automatic 10-mile LED light which flashes twice, every 20 seconds.

The two assistant lighthouse keepers' cottages were available for short term rental but have been for sale since August 2025.

== See also ==
- List of lighthouses in Scotland
- List of Northern Lighthouse Board lighthouses
