= St Abb's Head Lighthouse =

St Abbs Head Lighthouse
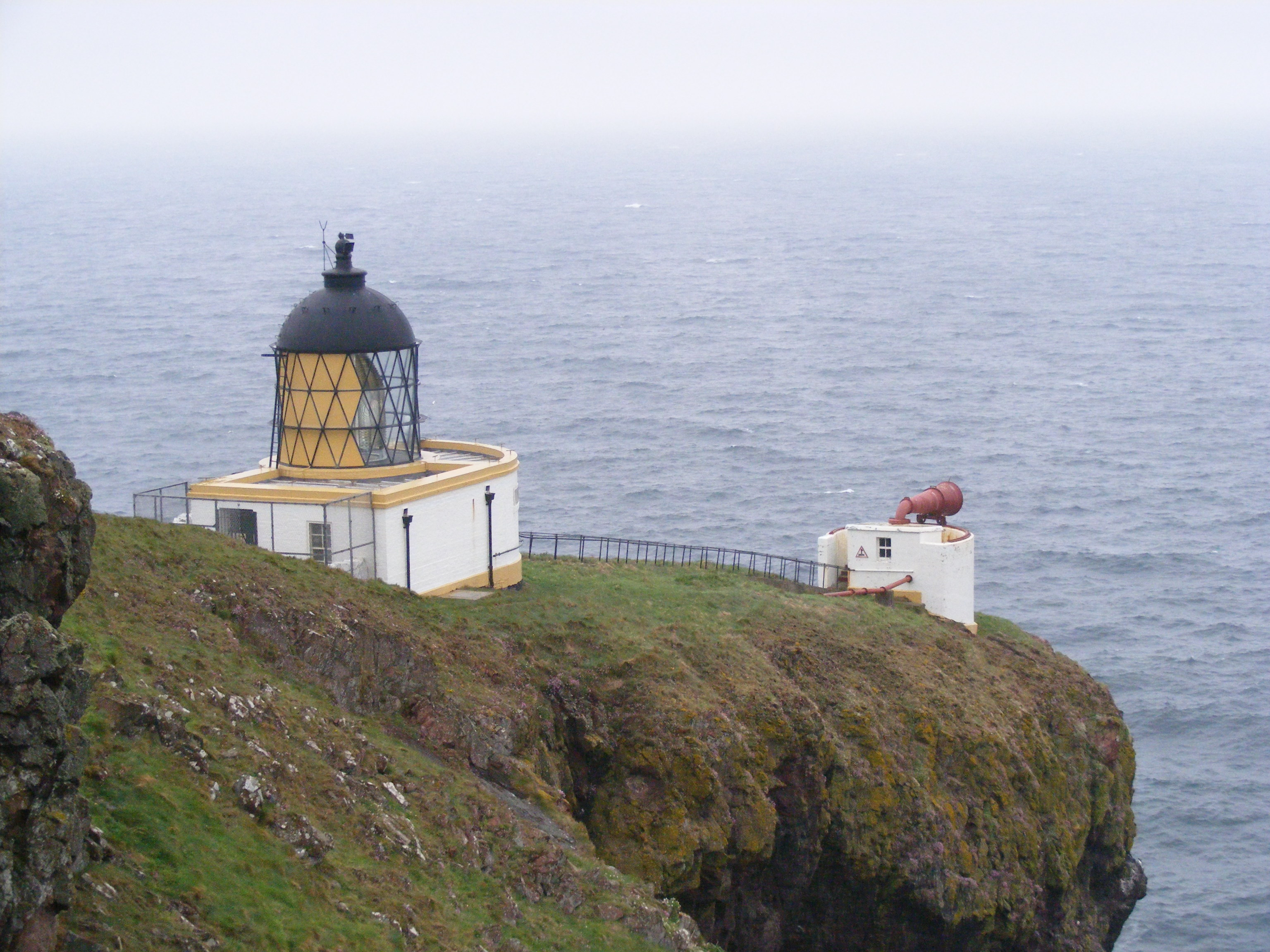
- The lighthouse and foghorn
- Location: St. Abb's Head; Berwickshire; Scotland; United Kingdom
- OS grid: NT9142569243
- Coordinates: 55°54′57.9″N 2°08′19.0″W

Tower
- Constructed: 1862
- Built by: Alan Stevenson, David Stevenson
- Construction: masonry building
- Automated: 1993
- Height: 9 metres (30 ft)
- Shape: lantern on the roof of a 1-storey service building
- Markings: white building, black lantern
- Power source: mains electricity
- Operator: National Trust for Scotland
- Heritage: category B listed building
- Fog signal: 1876 – 14 August 1987, 1 blast every 45s. First Siren in Scotland
- Racon: T(--) 18M

Light
- Focal height: 68 metres (223 ft)
- Lens: Electric Flashing Mains; Powered Biform LED Optic
- Intensity: 3,000,000 candela
- Range: 26 nautical miles (48 km; 30 mi)
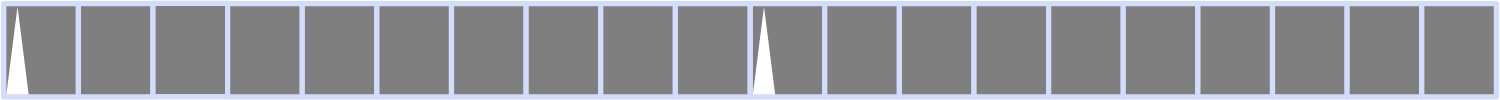
- Characteristic: Fl W 10s 68m 18M (Fl. 0.3 – ec. 9.7)

St Abb's Head Lighthouse stands on the cliffs at the rocky promontory of St Abb's Head, near the village of St Abbs in Berwickshire.

A signal station was established on the cliffs before 1820 and the facilities were shared by Trinity House and Her Majesty's Coastguard. The Northern Lighthouse Board recommended the building of a lighthouse at St Abb's Head after the sinking of the Martello on Carr Rock in 1857. The lighthouse was designed and built by the brothers David Stevenson and Thomas Stevenson and assisted navigation before and after sight of the Bell Rock and Isle of May lights disappeared from view. The light began service on 24 February 1862 and initially used oil to generate its light, it was converted to incandescent power in 1906 and to electricity in 1966 and finally automated in 1993. Before automation the lighthouse was staffed by three full-time keepers whose duties included keeping detailed weather records. The lighthouse has two km of single-track tarmaced road leading to it from the main road near St Abbs village, however it is suggested by the National Trust for Scotland that it is only used by disabled visitors, and there is limited parking. Visitors can walk to the Head where the lighthouse's buildings, though still in good repair, are not open to the public. A foghorn was established at the Head in 1876, being the first audible fog signal in Scotland. The original foghorn was driven by hot air engines before being replaced by oil driven ones in 1911 and then by diesel engines in December 1955. The fog signal was discontinued in 1987 although the horn is still in place and can be reached at the edge of the cliffs by a railed path from the lighthouse.

== See also ==
- List of lighthouses in Scotland
- List of Northern Lighthouse Board lighthouses
