= Scurdie Ness =

Lighthouse and headland in Montrose, Scotland

Scurdie Ness Lighthouse Scurdyness
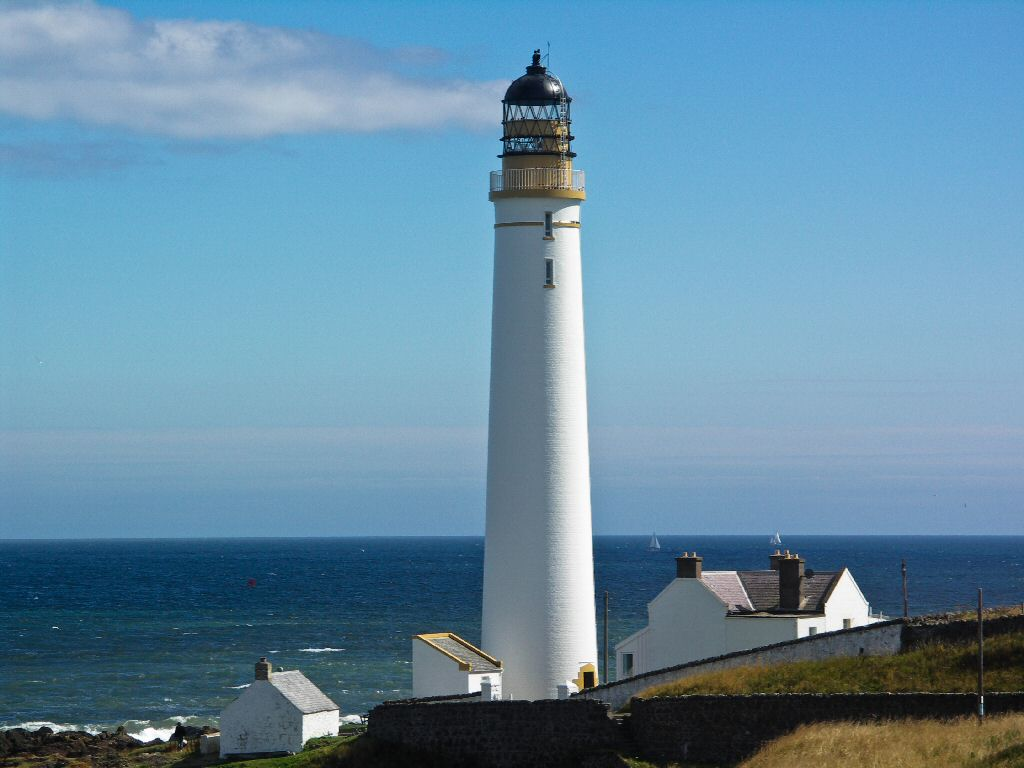
- Location: Montrose; Angus, Scotland; United Kingdom
- OS grid: NO7332256758
- Coordinates: 56°42′6.37″N 2°26′14.19″W

Tower
- Constructed: 1870
- Built by: David Stevenson
- Construction: stone tower
- Automated: 1987
- Height: 39 metres (128 ft)
- Shape: tapered cylindrical tower with balcony and lantern
- Markings: white tower, black lantern, ochre balcony and trim
- Power source: mains electricity
- Operator: Northern Lighthouse Board
- Heritage: category B listed building
- Racon: T

Light
- Focal height: 34 metres (112 ft)
- Intensity: 182,000 candela
- Range: 23 nautical miles (43 km; 26 mi)
- Characteristic: Fl (3) W 20s.

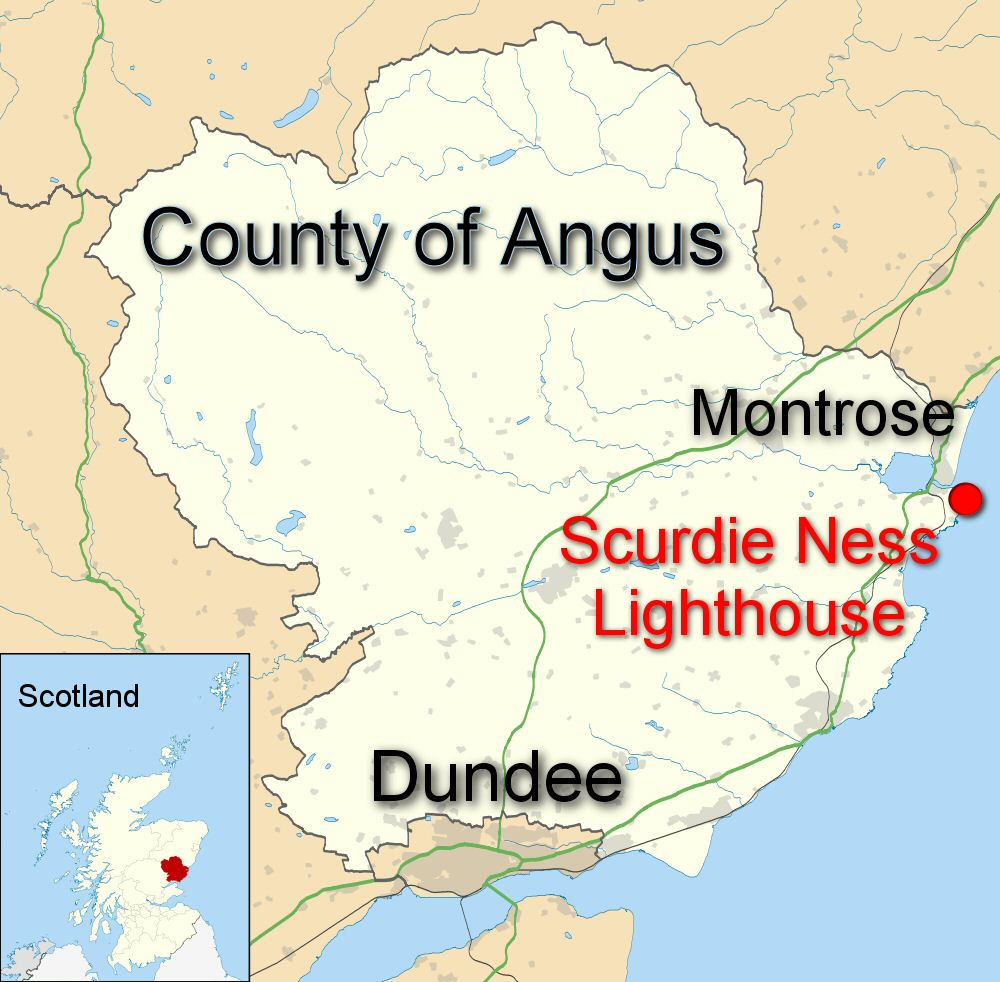
Location of Scurdie Ness Lighthouse

Scurdie Ness is a headland located on the South side of the River South Esk estuary, Montrose, Angus, Scotland. The River leads from the North Sea into Montrose Harbour and then into Montrose Basin. The headland has also been referred to as Scurdy Ness, Montrose point or Montroseness. The word Scurdie is a local word for the volcanic rock found there and Ness means a promontory, cape or headland. The coastline from Scurdie Ness to Rickle Craig has been designated a Site of Special Scientific Interest (SSSI code 1351).

== Scurdie Ness Lighthouse ==
Scurdie Ness Lighthouse is located on the headland and has also been referred to as Montroseness Lighthouse. In 1867 the seafaring community of Ferryden made representations to the Commissioners of Northern Lighthouses to have a light established on Montrose Point due to the numerous shipwrecks and great loss of life along that coast. There are 11 wrecks recorded around the mouth of the estuary.

The lighthouse was built by David Stevenson and Thomas Stevenson and at 6 pm on Tuesday 1 March 1870 the tower was lit for the first time. During World War II the lighthouse was temporarily painted black so that it could not be used by the German bombers as a daytime reference point. The light was not illuminated except when requested by the Royal Navy.

The lighthouse is a category B listed building of architectural/historic interest, Historical Scotland Building ID: 4958. Royal Commission on the Ancient and Historical Monuments of Scotland - Canmore ID: 36262

Originally the light characteristic was fixed white but in 1907 was changed to isophase white 60 seconds (i.e., light 30 seconds, eclipse 30 seconds). Scurdie Ness lighthouse was converted to automatic operation in 1987 and now displays 3 white flashes separated by 2.5 seconds and repeated every 20 seconds. The light is 182,000 candlepower and on a clear night can be seen for approximately 42 km.

The buildings within the grounds of the lighthouse are now privately owned. Cars are not allowed along the road leading from Ferryden to the lighthouse but it is a popular walk and sightings of seals and dolphins are not unusual. Whales are sometimes seen in the area including rare sightings of humpback whales.

== Geology ==
Scurdie Ness is a Geological Conservation Review (GCR) site. The Old Red Sandstone, lavas and associated sedimentary rocks found there are part of the Montrose Volcanic Formation. These rocks were formed around 410 million years ago from lava being erupted from a volcano lying to the north-east in the North Sea and known as the Montrose volcanic centre. Scurdie Ness is renowned for its agates formed by fluids flowing through the lava and depositing silica in cavities. Agates can be found embedded in the lava or lying on the shoreline and in neighbouring fields. A collection of agates from the Scurdie Ness area can be seen at the Montrose Museum.

== See also ==
- List of lighthouses in Scotland
- List of Northern Lighthouse Board lighthouses
