= Auskerry =

Small island in eastern Orkney, Scotland

Soond (Scots)

Location
- Auskerry shown within Orkney
- OS grid reference: HY675165
- Coordinates: 59.032267°N 2.569761°W

Name
- Name meaning: east skerry
- Old Norse name: Austrsker

Physical geography
- Island group: Orkney
- Area: 85 hectares (0.33 sq mi)
- Area rank: 157=
- Highest elevation: 18 metres (59 ft)

Administration
- Council area: Orkney Islands
- Country: Scotland
- Sovereign state: United Kingdom

Demographics
- Population: 2
- Population rank: 88=
- Population density: 2.35 people/km^{2}
- Auskerry Lighthouse
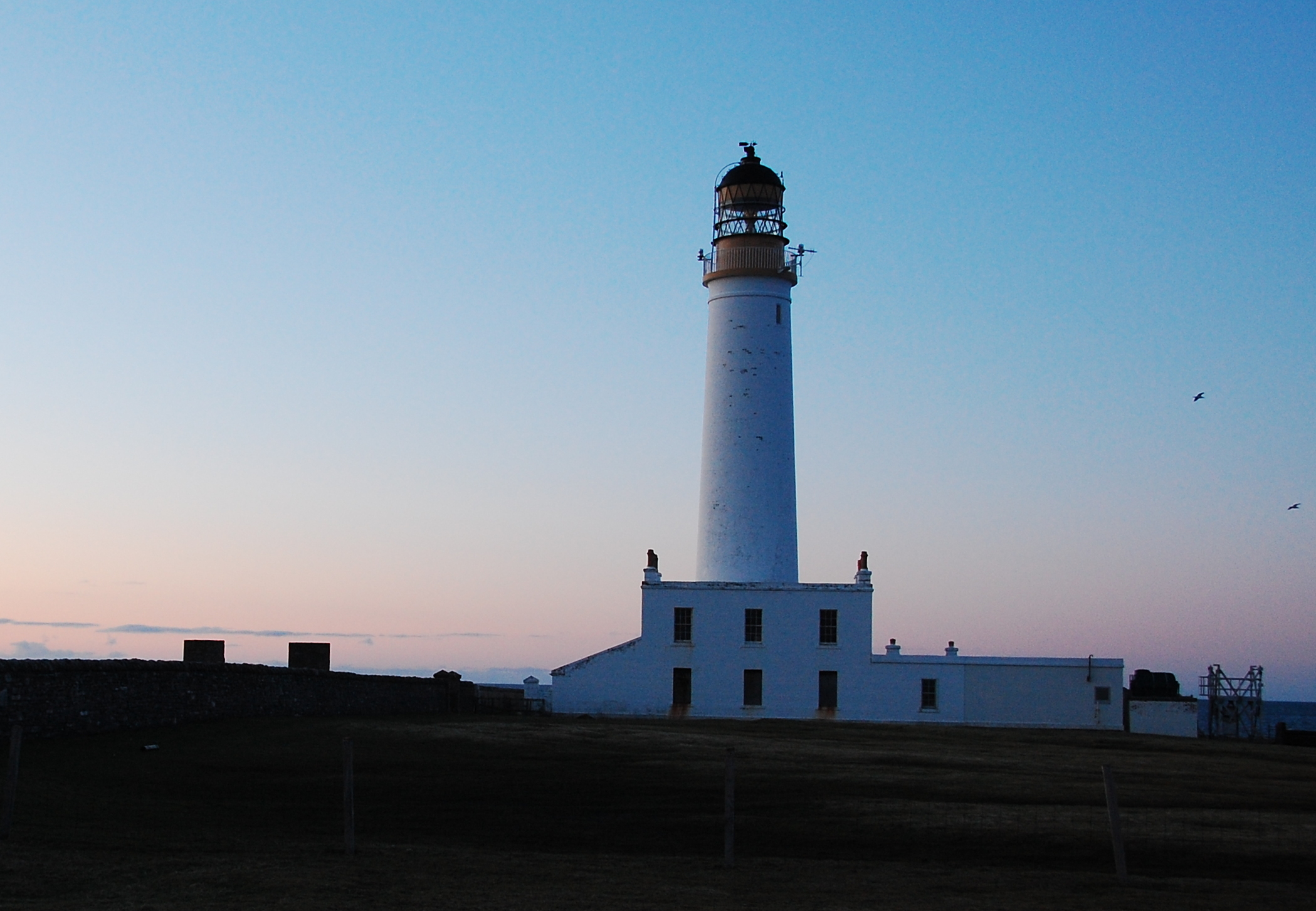
- Constructed: 1866
- Built by: David Stevenson, Thomas Stevenson
- Construction: stone
- Automated: 1961
- Height: 34 m (112 ft)
- Shape: cylindrical tower with balcony and lantern
- Markings: white tower, black lantern, ochre trim
- Power source: solar power
- Operator: Northern Lighthouse Board
- Heritage: category B listed building
- Fog signal: None
- Focal height: 34 m (112 ft)
- Range: 20 nmi (37 km; 23 mi)
- Characteristic: Fl W 20s

Auskerry (Scots: Soond; Old Norse: Austrsker, east skerry) is a small island in eastern Orkney, Scotland. It lies in the North Sea south of Stronsay and has a lighthouse, completed in 1866.

== Description ==
Auskerry is a small, flat, red sandstone islet, 3 miles (5 km) south of Stronsay. A standing stone and mediaeval chapel are signs of early settlement. The island was uninhabited for a time after the automation of the lighthouse in the 1960s. It was previously a popular location for hunting seals.

Auskerry has been inhabited for nearly 50 years by a family (of the reporter Hamish Auskerry) who keep a flock of rare North Ronaldsay sheep. There are three small wind turbines and four solar panels on the island, which provide most of the power. After a series of expansions and renovations, the single roomed stone bothy is now a modern house with four bedrooms, kitchen, shower room and living room. The chemical toilet is outdoors due to the complication of installing septic tanks. Mail is delivered from Stronsay, once a month, by a fishing boat.

== Lighthouse ==
The lighthouse lights the north entrance to the Stronsay Firth. It was built in 1866 by engineers David and Thomas Stevenson. It is attached to two flats; the lower one is used all year as a store and the top one is used mainly in summer.

The Hastings County, a 116-metre Norwegian cargo ship, ran ashore on north west of Auskerry in 1926 during thick fog. The vessel broke in half and wreckage is spread over a wide area, with the engine on the beach.

== Wildlife ==
Auskerry is designated a Special Protection Area due to its importance as a nesting area for Arctic tern and European storm petrel; 4.2% of the breeding population of European storm petrels in Great Britain nest on the island. The island has been designated an Important Bird Area (IBA) by BirdLife International because it supports significant breeding populations of seabirds.

== See also ==
- Isle of Auskerry (Handmade Business)
- List of lighthouses in Scotland
- List of Northern Lighthouse Board lighthouses
