= Cantick Head Lighthouse =

Lighthouse in Orkney Islands, Scotland

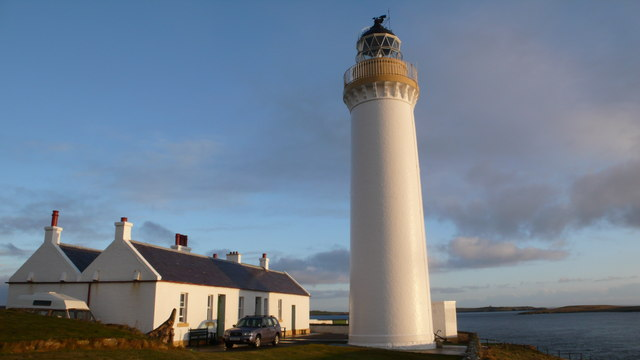
- Cantick Head in 2008
- Location: South Walls; Orkney; Scotland
- OS grid: ND3470289394
- Coordinates: 58.787068°N 3.131344°W

Tower
- Constructed: 1858
- Built by: David Stevenson, Thomas Stevenson
- Construction: stone tower
- Automated: 1991
- Height: 22 metres (72 ft)
- Shape: cylindrical tower with balcony and lantern
- Markings: white tower, black lantern, ochre trim
- Power source: solar power
- Operator: Northern Lighthouse Board
- Heritage: category B listed building
- Fog signal: deactivated in 1987

Light
- Focal height: 35 metres (115 ft)
- Range: 18 nautical miles (33 km; 21 mi)
- Characteristic: Fl W 20s.

The Cantick Head Lighthouse is an active 19th century lighthouse on the Scottish island of South Walls in the Orkney Islands. It is located at the end of Cantick Head, a long peninsula on the south-eastern coast of South Walls that overlooks the Pentland Firth and the Sound of Hoxa, which forms the southern entry to the natural harbour of Scapa Flow.

South Walls is joined to the larger island of Hoy by a narrow causeway, allowing road access to the village of Longhope, Hackness and then the lighthouse further to the south-east.

== History ==
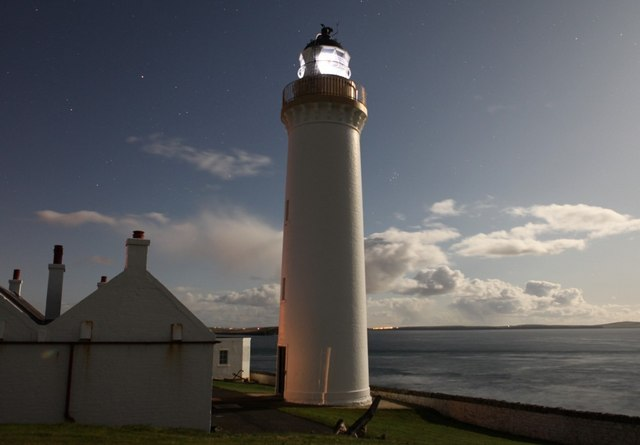
The lighthouse by night

The need for the lighthouse was first raised by the Northern Lights Commissioners in 1854 and was quickly approved, but delays in agreeing the details for the light and that of the buildings meant that construction did not start until two years later in 1856. The design and construction was overseen by the notable lighthouse engineers Thomas and David Stevenson.

The light first entered service in 1858, and consists of a 22 metres (72 ft) high cylinder-shaped tower, which is painted white. It supports a single gallery and a lantern with a black cupola.

Adjacent to the tower are a set of keeper's cottages and subsidiary buildings, bounded by a walled compound containing a sundial. A principal keeper's house was a later addition. In 1913, a foghorn was installed at the station, which continued in use until 1987. In 1991 the light was converted to automatic operation, and the keeper's houses were sold and converted to holiday accommodation. In 2017, the accommodation including the first assistant, second assistant and principal keeper's houses were offered for sale at a price of £300,000.

With a focal height of 35 metres (115 ft) above sea level, the light can be seen for 18 nautical miles (33 km; 21 mi). Its light characteristic is made up of a flash of white light every twenty seconds.

The lighthouse is maintained by the Northern Lighthouse Board, and is registered under the international Admiralty number A3602 and has the NGA identifier of 114–3088.

== Listed buildings ==
The entire station including the tower, keeper's cottages, outhouses and sundial are protected as a category B listed building.

== See also ==
- List of lighthouses in Scotland
- List of Northern Lighthouse Board lighthouses
