= Weavers Point =

Weavers Point (Scottish Gaelic: Rubha an Fhigheadair) is a headland to the north of the entrance to Loch Maddy, on the north eastern coastline of North Uist in the Western Isles of Scotland. There has been a lighthouse on the headland since 1980.

== Lighthouse ==
Weavers Point Lighthouse
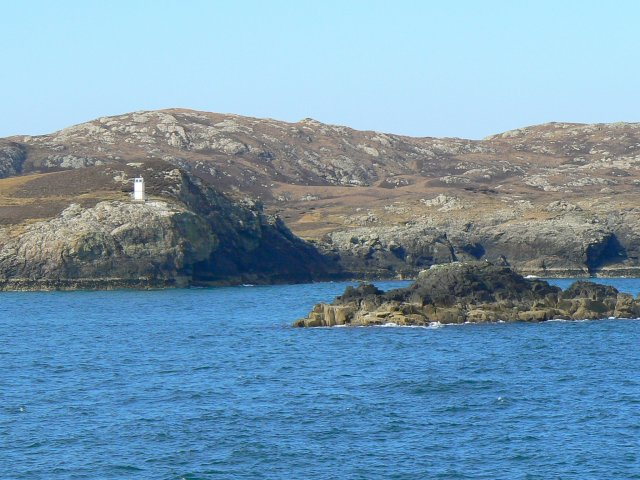
- Location: North Uist; Scotland; United Kingdom
- Coordinates: 57°36′29.6″N 7°05′59.4″W

Tower
- Constructed: 1980
- Foundation: reinforced concrete
- Construction: metal skeletal tower
- Automated: 1980
- Height: 20 metres (66 ft)
- Shape: square tower covered by aluminium panels with balcony and light on the top
- Markings: white tower
- Operator: Northern Lighthouse Board

Light
- First lit: 1980
- Focal height: 20 metres (66 ft)
- Range: 7 nautical miles (13 km; 8.1 mi)
- Characteristic: Fl W 3s

The light is modern construction established in 1980. It is a skeletal tower covered by aluminium panels with the light on the top, the characteristic light is not available.

== See also ==
- List of lighthouses in Scotland
- List of Northern Lighthouse Board lighthouses
