= An t-Iasgair =

An t-Iasgair Light
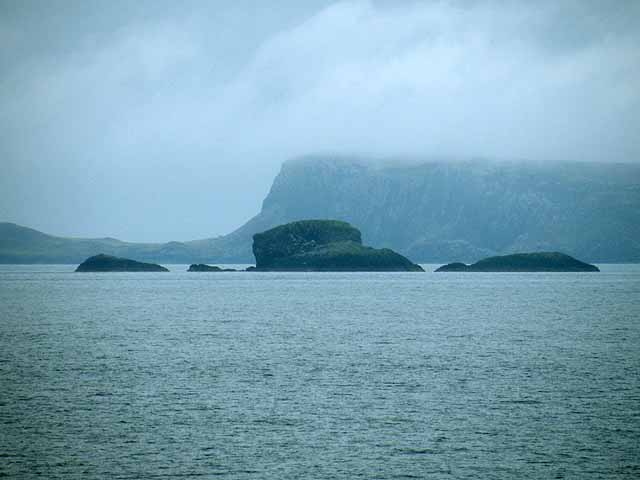
- Sgeir nan Ruideag, An t-Iasgair and An Dubh Sgeir
- Location: An t-Iasgair, Highland, United Kingdom
- Coordinates: 57°41′07″N 6°26′01″W

Tower
- Construction: metal skeletal structure
- Markings: white structure
- Power source: solar power
- Operator: Northern Lighthouse Board

Light
- Focal height: 23 m (75 ft)
- Range: 9 nmi (17 km; 10 mi)
- Characteristic: Fl W 6s

An t-Iasgair (Scottish Gaelic for the Fisherman) is a skerry in the Little Minch, to the north of the Trotternish peninsula of Skye. It lies 1.5 miles north north west of Ru Bornesketaig and is marked by a navigation light. It is the largest and highest in a group of three rocks, with smaller neighbours of Sgeir nan Ruideag and An Dubh Sgeir.

== See also ==
- List of lighthouses in Scotland
- List of Northern Lighthouse Board lighthouses
