= Holborn Head =

Headland in Highland, Scotland

Coordinates: 58°37′23″N 03°32′06″W

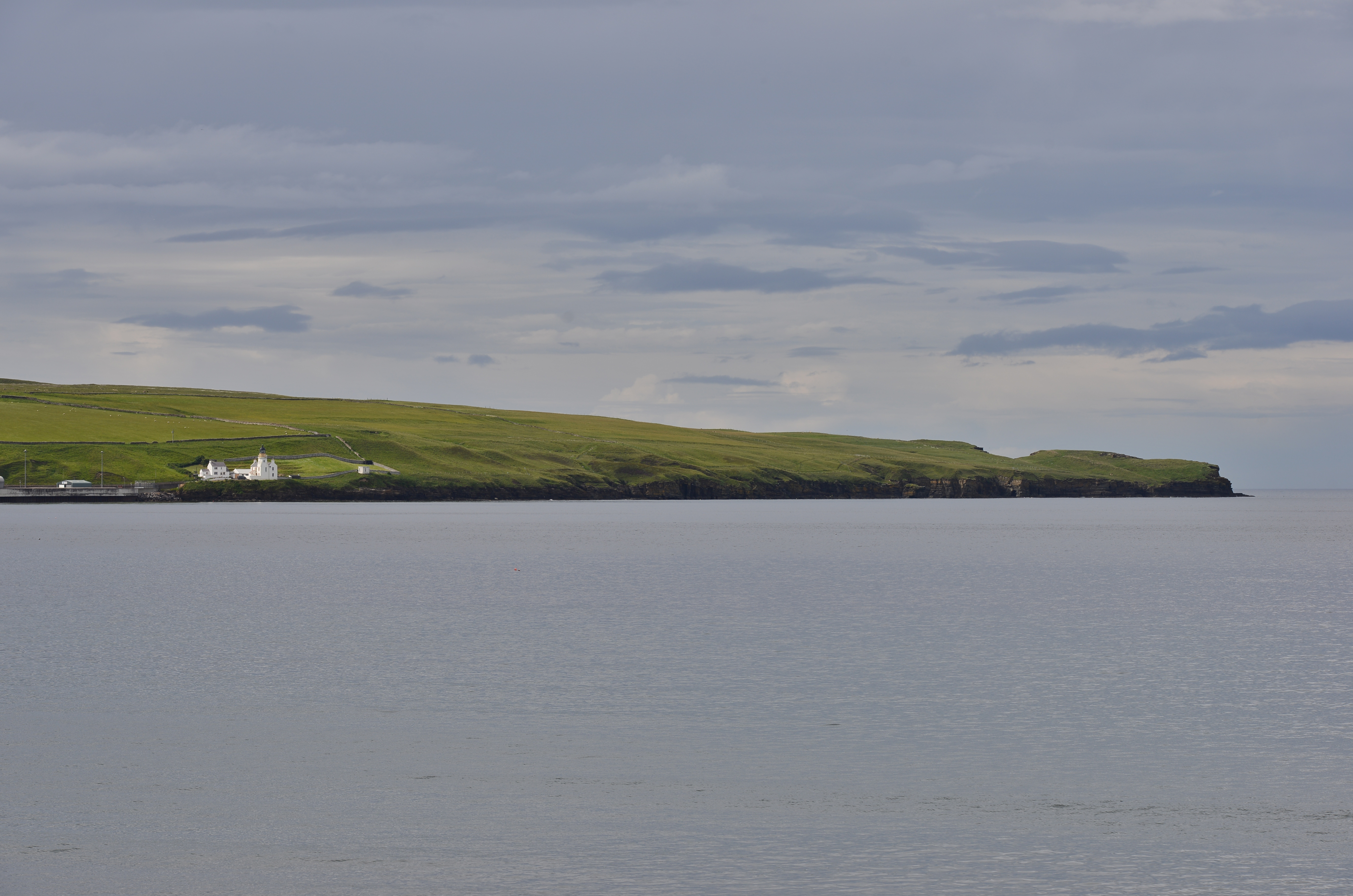
Holborn Head

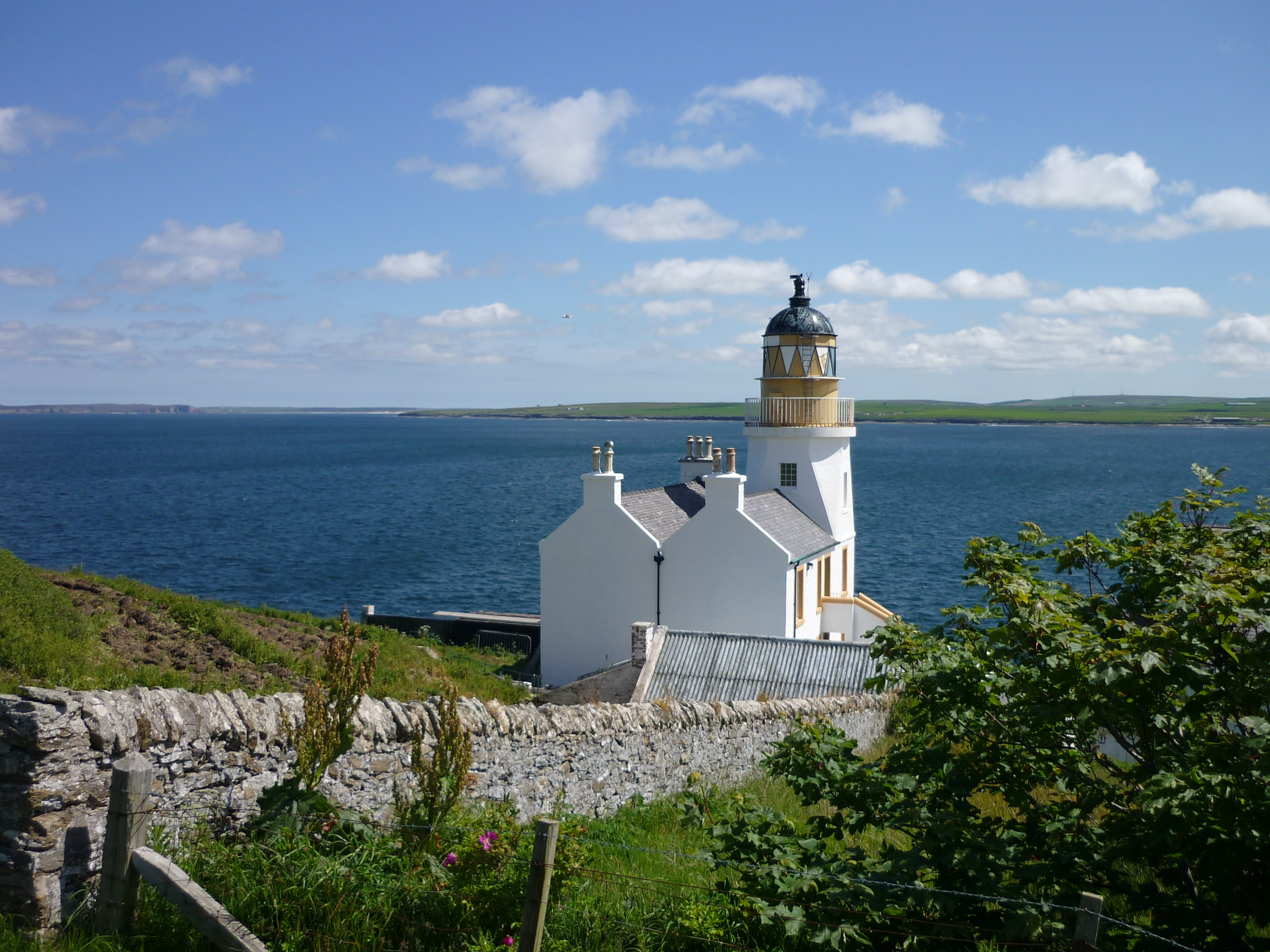
Holborn Head Lighthouse

Holborn Head is a rocky headland on the north-facing Atlantic coast of Caithness, Scotland. It forms the western termination of Thurso Bay.

The name Holborn apparently comes from the Old Norse Hóllborg, meaning "hill fort". There are remains of a promontory fort at the tip of the headland, dating to the Bronze or Iron Age. About a kilometre to the south, near Scrabster Harbour, is Holborn Head Lighthouse. Designed by David and Thomas Stevenson, the lighthouse was completed in 1862 and remained operational until 2003.

There is a footpath allowing walkers to make a circuit of the headland, beginning at the lighthouse. The walk offers clear views over to Dunnet Head and the Orkney Islands.
