= Ruvaal Lighthouse =

Lighthouse in Scotland

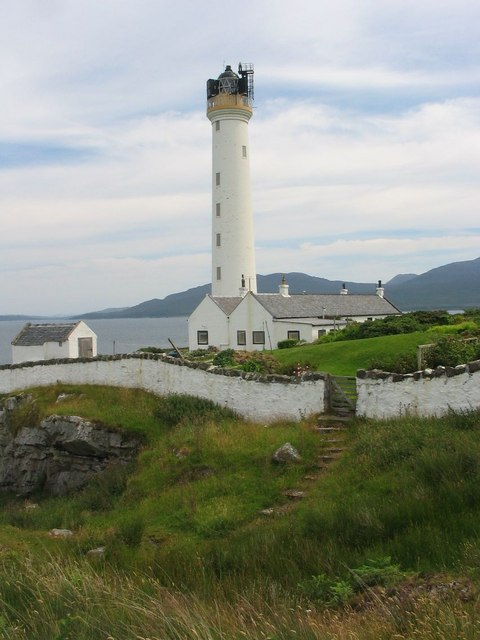
- Ruvaal Lighthouse
- Location: Islay; Inner Hebrides; Scotland
- OS grid: NR4257679166
- Coordinates: 55.93635°N 6.123483°W

Tower
- Constructed: 1859
- Built by: David Stevenson, Thomas Stevenson
- Automated: 1983
- Height: 34 metres (112 ft)
- Shape: cylindrical tower with balcony and lantern
- Markings: white tower, black lantern, ochre trim
- Operator: Northern Lighthouse Board
- Heritage: category B listed building

Light
- Focal height: 45 metres (148 ft)
- Range: 19 nautical miles (35 km; 22 mi)
- Characteristic: Fl (3) W 15s

The Ruvaal, Rhuvaal, or Rubh'a' Mhàil Lighthouse is a listed 19th-century lighthouse located at the north-eastern end of the island of Islay, in the Inner Hebrides off the west coast of Scotland. The active lighthouse marks the northern approaches to the Sound of Islay, a narrow channel separating Islay from the adjacent island of Jura, and is one of the seven lighthouses operated by the Northern Lighthouse Board, which act as maritime aids to navigation on and around Islay.

== History ==
The need for lights near the sound had been identified as early as 1835 by Robert Stevenson, with the Board of Trade requesting that the light should cover the Neva Rocks to the west. This requirement meant that a substantial tower was required. It was designed by the brothers David Stevenson and Thomas the sons of Robert, from the notable Stevenson lighthouse engineering family.

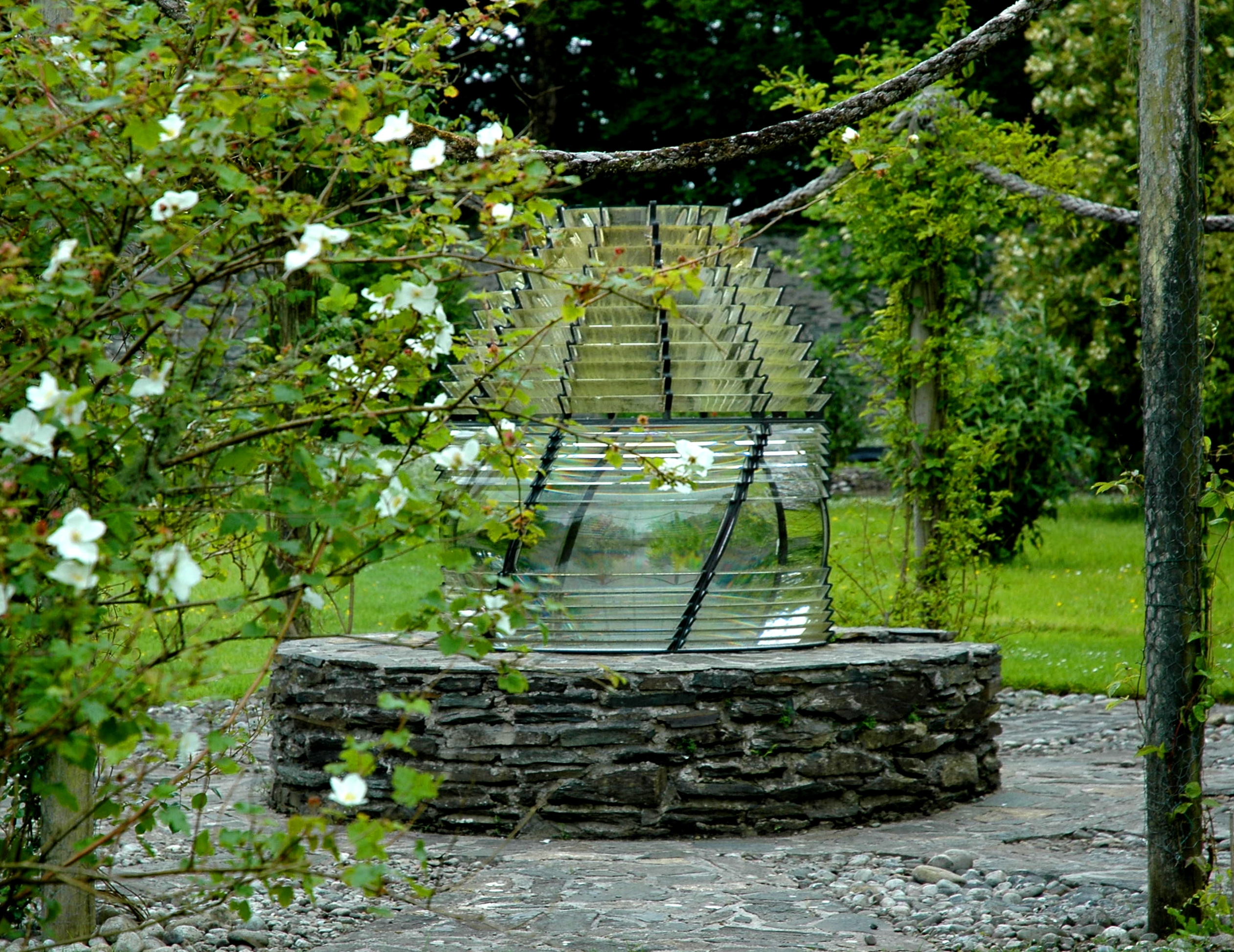
The original lens in the gardens of Colonsay House

Construction started in 1857 and it was completed in 1859. The total cost was £6,500 (equivalent to £822,402 as of 2023). The lighthouse consists of a brick 34-metre-high (112 ft) cylindrical white washed tower, supporting the lantern and single gallery. It has 158 steps to the top of the tower. Sandstone was used to construct the window and door openings. The architecture of the long keeper's cottages was criticised in a report from 1861 as looking 'more like dog kennels than anything else'.

Access to the lighthouse has always been difficult due to its remote location, bringing in supplies and relief keepers was eased by the use of helicopters in the 1980s. Helicopters were also used to help in construction of an overhead electricity line to the site in 1981. One helicopter crashed during the project, and the pilot survived the accident.

The new supply meant that a sealed beam electric lighting unit could be installed in 1982, and the light was automated the following year. The keepers were withdrawn and the cottages were sold, which are now private property. The tower and its light are still operated and maintained by the Northern Lighthouse Board.

The original third-order fresnel optic was preserved and now forms part of a garden feature at Colonsay House on the nearby island of Colonsay.

== Listed buildings ==
The entire station including the tower, keeper's cottages, and boundary walls are protected as a category B listed building.

== See also ==
- List of lighthouses in Scotland
- List of Northern Lighthouse Board lighthouses
