= List of Northern Lighthouse Board lighthouses =

This is a list of the currently operational lighthouses of the Northern Lighthouse Board (NLB). The list is divided by geographical location, and then by whether the lighthouses are classed by the NLB as a 'major lighthouse' or a 'minor light'. Former NLB lighthouses now disposed of are not included in the list.

== Scotland (except principal island groups) ==
=== Major lighthouses ===
Name	Image	Area	Built
Ailsa Craig Lighthouse		South Ayrshire	1886
Ardnamurchan Lighthouse		Highland	1849
Bell Rock Lighthouse		Angus	1810
Buchan Ness Lighthouse		Boddam	1827
Cape Wrath Lighthouse		Highland	1828
Chanonry Point Lighthouse		Chanonry Point	1846
Corsewall Lighthouse		Dumfries and Galloway	1816
Covesea Skerries Lighthouse		Lossiemouth	1846
Crammag Head Lighthouse		Dumfries and Galloway	1913
Davaar Lighthouse		Argyll and Bute	1854
Duncansby Head Lighthouse		Duncansby Head	1924
Dunnet Head Lighthouse		Dunnet Head	1831
Fidra Lighthouse		East Lothian	1885
Fife Ness Lighthouse		Fife Ness	1975
Girdleness Lighthouse		Aberdeen	1833
Holy Isle Inner Lighthouse		North Ayrshire	1877
Holy Isle Outer Lighthouse		North Ayrshire	1905
Inchkeith Lighthouse		Fife	1804
Isle of May Lighthouse		Fife	1816
Kinnaird Head Lighthouses		Kinnaird Head	
Mull of Galloway Lighthouse		Mull of Galloway	1830
Mull of Kintyre Lighthouse		Mull of Kintyre, Southend	1788
North Rona Lighthouse		Outer Hebrides	1984
Noss Head Lighthouse		Highland	1849
Pladda Lighthouse		North Ayrshire	1790
Rattray Head lighthouse		Rattray Head	1895
Rua Reidh Lighthouse		Highland	1912
St. Abbs Lighthouse		Berwickshire	1862
Sanda Island Lighthouse		Argyll and Bute	1850
Scurdie Ness Lighthouse		Scurdie Ness	1870
Stoer Head Lighthouse		Stoer Head, Lochinver	1870
Strathy Point Lighthouse		Highland	1958
Stroma Lighthouse		Caithness	1890
Sule Skerry Lighthouse		Orkney Islands	1895
Tarbat Ness Lighthouse		Highland	1830

=== Minor lights ===
- Ardtornish
- Bass Rock
- Cailleach Head
- Cairnbulg Briggs
- Corran Narrows North East
- Corran Point
- Craigton Point
- Dunollie
- Elie Ness
- Hestan Island
- Holy Island (Inner)
- Lady Isle
- Little Ross
- Little Ross Beacon
- Loch Eriboll
- Loch Ryan
- Longman Point
- Oban NLB Pier
- Sandaig
- Sgeir Bhuidhe
- Sula Sgeir
- Turnberry

== The Hebrides ==
=== Major lighthouses ===
- Barra Head
- Butt of Lewis
- Dubh Artach
- Eilean Glas
- Flannan Islands
- Haskeir Lighthouse
- Hyskeir
- Lismore
- Monach
- Neist Point
- Ornsay Beacon
- Rinns of Islay
- Rona Lighthouse
- Ruvaal
- Scarinish
- Skerryvore
- Tiumpan Head
- Ushenish

=== Minor lights ===
- An T-Iasgair
- Ardmore
- Ardtreck
- Bunessan
- Cabbage North
- Cabbage South
- Cairn na Burgh More
- Cairns of Coll
- Calvay
- Canna
- Carragh an t'Sruith
- Carragh Mhor
- Channel Rock (Castlebay)
- Crowlin
- Drowning Rock
- Duart Point
- Dubh Sgeir (Castlebay)
- Dubh Sgeir (Kerrera)
- Dubh Sgeir (Leverburgh)
- Dubh Sgeir (Luing)
- Dunvegan
- Eigg
- Eight Metre Rock
- Eilean a Chuirn
- Eilean Bàn
- Eilean nan Gabhar
- Eilean Trodday
- Eileanan Dubha
- Eyre Point
- Fladda
- Gamhna Gigha
- The Garvellachs
- Gasay Island
- Gasker
- Green Island
- Grey Rocks
- Janes Tower
- Kyle Rhea
- L2
- L2a
- Lady Rock
- Leverburgh (Front)
- Leverburgh (Rear)
- Loch Indaal (Rubh an Duin)
- McArthur's Head
- Milaid Point
- Na Cuiltean
- Narstay
- North Spit Of Kerrera
- Ornsay Beacon
- Port Ellen Sector
- Red Rock
- Reisa an T-struith
- Ruadh Sgeir
- Rubh'a Chruidh
- Rubh Glas (Front)
- Rubh Glas (Rear)
- Rubh Uisenis
- Rubha nan Gall
- Scalasaig
- Sgeir Chruaidh
- Sgeir-na-Cailleach
- Skervuile
- Sleat Point
- Vaternish
- Weavers Point

== Orkney ==
=== Major lighthouses ===
- Auskerry
- Brough of Birsay
- Cantick Head
- Copinsay
- Hoy Sound High
- Hoy Sound Low
- North Ronaldsay
- Noup Head
- Pentland Skerries High
- Pentland Skerries Low
- Start Point
- Sule Skerry
- Tor Ness

=== Minor lights ===
- Barrel of Butter
- Calf of Eday
- Cava
- Helliar Holm
- Hoxa Head
- Lother Rock
- Nevi Skerry
- Papa Stronsay
- Rose Ness
- Ruff Reef
- Skerry of Ness
- Swona

== Shetland ==
=== Major lighthouses ===
- Bressay
- Eshaness
- Fair Isle North
- Fair Isle South
- Firths Voe
- Foula
- Muckle Flugga
- Out Skerries
- Point of Fethaland
- Sumburgh Head

=== Minor lights ===
- Bagi Stack
- Balta Sound
- Brother Isle
- Bullia Skerry
- Fugla Ness
- Gruney
- Head Of Mula
- Hillswick
- Holm Of Skaw
- Hoo Stack
- Little Holm
- Lunna Holm
- Mousa
- Muckle Holm
- Muckle Roe
- Muckle Skerry
- Mull of Eswick
- Ness Of Sound
- Outer Skerry
- Rova Head
- Rumble Rock
- Skate of Marrister
- Suther Ness
- Symbister Ness
- Uyea Sound
- Vaila Sound
- Ve Skerries
- Wether Holm
- Whitehill

== Isle of Man ==
=== Major lighthouses ===
- Chicken Rock
- Douglas Head
- Maughold Head
- Point of Ayre

=== Minor lights ===
- Langness
- Thousla Rock

== See also ==
- List of lighthouses in Scotland
