= Ushenish =

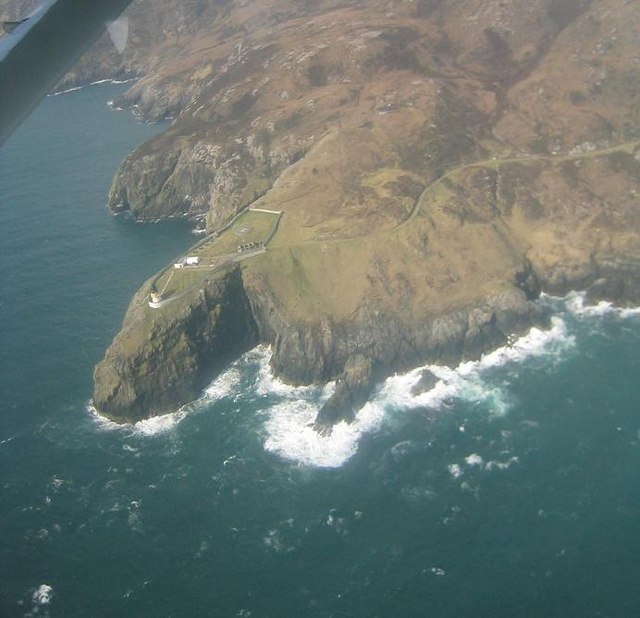
Aerial view of the Ushenish Lighthouse

Ushenish is a headland on the remote east coast of South Uist in the Outer Hebrides of Scotland. Ushenish Lighthouse has been on the headland since 1857.
