= Ailsa Craig Lighthouse =

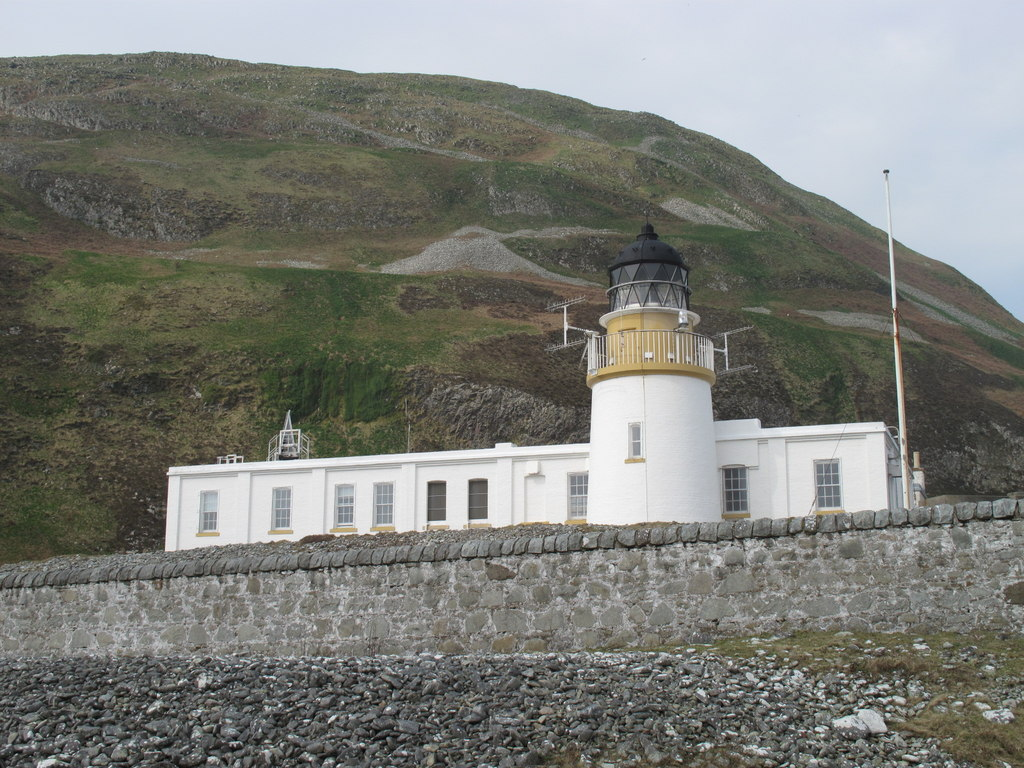
- Ailsa Craig Lighthouse
- Location: Ailsa Craig; Firth of Clyde; Scotland
- OS grid: NX 0252199706
- Coordinates: 55.251898°N 5.108413°W

Tower
- Constructed: 1886
- Built by: Thomas Stevenson, David Alan Stevenson
- Construction: masonry tower
- Automated: 1990
- Height: 11 metres (36 ft)
- Shape: cylindrical tower with balcony and lantern attached to 1-storey keeper's house
- Markings: white tower and lantern
- Power source: solar power
- Operator: Northern Lighthouse Board
- Heritage: category B listed building

Light
- First lit: 15 June 1886
- Focal height: 18 metres (59 ft)
- Range: 17 nautical miles [31 km]
- Characteristic: Fl W 4s. 18m 17M AilsaCraig dome [Fl. 0.1 sec - ec. 3.9 sec] [Sector: 145° - 028°]

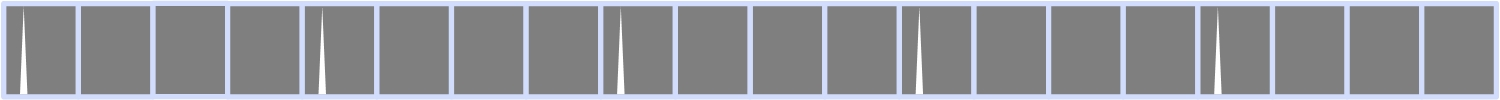

The Ailsa Craig Lighthouse is an active 19th-century lighthouse located on Ailsa Craig, an island in the Firth of Clyde, just offshore from Girvan, South Ayrshire, Scotland.

== History ==
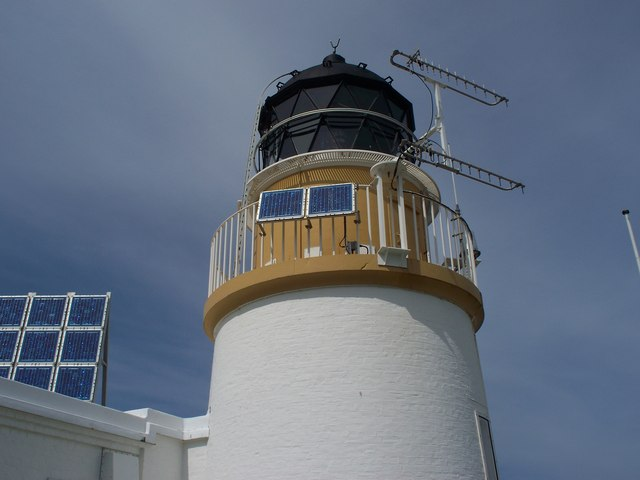
Detail of the tower

The construction of the Ailsa Craig Lighthouse began in 1882. It was completed in 1886, the construction being overseen by Thomas and David Alan Stevenson.

The lens at Ailsa Craig Lighthouse was made by Barbier and Fenestre, Paris, reflecting the fact that many lighthouse lens makers of the nineteenth century were French, with Engish lens makers only emerging in the early twentieth century.

Initially, the lighthouse used an oil-burning light, which was first exhibited on the night of 15th June 1886. In January 1911, the light was converted to incandescent gas lighting.

Wireless telephone communications were established on Ailsa Craig in 1935. Before this, the lightkeepers relied on pigeons to send and receive messages.

Fog signals were discontinued in 1987. Then, in 1990, the lighthouse was automated, and a refurbishment took place in 2001, when it was converted to run on solar power.

Ailsa Craig is also known as "Paddy's Mile Stone" as it lies halfway between the cities of Glasgow and Belfast. As well as being a local landmark and a well known marine navigational hazard the island is a protected bird sanctuary.

In June 2018 the former lighthouse keepers' cottages, now derelict, were placed for sale by auction.

== See also ==
- List of Northern Lighthouse Board lighthouses
- List of lighthouses in Scotland
