= Thomas Stevenson =

Scottish civil engineer, lighthouse designer and meteorologist (1818–1887)

PRSE MInstCE FRSSA FSAScot Thomas Stevenson
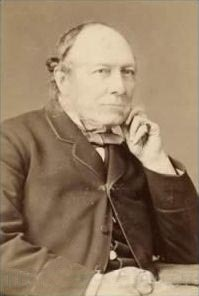
- Stevenson in 1880
- Born: 22 July 1818; Edinburgh, Scotland
- Died: 8 May 1887 (aged 68); Edinburgh, Scotland
- Occupation: Lighthouse engineer
- Employer: Northern Lighthouse Board
- Spouse: Maggie Balfour (m. 1848)
- Children: Robert Louis Stevenson
- Parent(s): Robert Stevenson (father); Jean Smith (mother)
- Relatives: David Stevenson (brother); Alan Stevenson (brother)

Signature
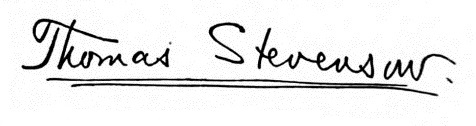

Thomas Stevenson PRSE MInstCE FRSSA FSAScot (22 July 1818 – 8 May 1887) was a pioneering Scottish civil engineer, lighthouse designer and meteorologist, who designed over thirty lighthouses in and around Scotland, as well as the Stevenson screen used in meteorology. His designs, celebrated as ground breaking, ushered in a new era of lighthouse creation.

He served as president of the Royal Scottish Society of Arts (1859–60), as president of the Royal Society of Edinburgh (1884–86), and was a co-founder of the Scottish Meteorological Society.

He was the father of writer Robert Louis Stevenson.

== Life and career ==
He was born at 2 Baxters Place in Edinburgh, on 22 July 1818, the youngest son of engineer Robert Stevenson, and his wife (and step-sister) Jean Smith. He was educated at the Royal High School in Edinburgh.

Thomas Stevenson was a devout and regular attendee at St. Stephen's Church in Stockbridge, at the north end of St Vincent Street, Edinburgh.

He lived with his family at Baxters Place until he got married in 1848. He then got a house at 8 Howard Place. By 1855 he moved to 1 Inverleith Terrace. From at least 1860 he lived at 17 Heriot Row, a large Georgian terraced townhouse in Edinburgh's New Town.

In 1864, he published The design and construction of harbours: a treatise on maritime engineering. The book was based on an article he had originally written for the Encyclopædia Britannica, and covered the principles and practices involved in harbour design and construction. The work discussed the geological and physical features affecting harbour design, the generation and impact of waves, along with construction materials and masonry types for quay walls. The book also explored the efficacy of tides and fresh water in maintaining outfalls. A second edition of the book was published in 1874.

In 1869, as a successful experiment into using the newly invented electric light for lighthouses, Stevenson had an underwater cable installed from the eastern part of Granton Harbour in Edinburgh, and a light on the end of the Trinity Chain Pier was controlled from half a mile away by an operator on the harbour. He designed the Stevenson screen as a shelter to shield meteorological instruments, and this has been widely adopted.

He died at 17 Heriot Row in Edinburgh on 8 May 1887 and is buried in the Stevenson family vault in New Calton Cemetery. The vault lies midway along the eastern wall.

=== Stevenson's formula for the prediction of wave heights ===
In the course of his work as a lighthouse and harbour engineer, Stevenson had made observations of wave heights at various locations in Scotland over a number of years. In 1852, he published a paper in which he suggested that waves increased in height by a ratio approximate to the square root of their distance from the windward shore. Stevenson developed this into the simple formula $H = 1.5\sqrt F$, in which $H$ is the wave height in feet and $F$ is the fetch in miles.

Essential components for wave height prediction, most notably wind speed, are missing from Stevenson's formula. In 1852, mathematical analysis of the theory of water waves, and methods for numerical assessment of factors such as shoaling and surge, were in their infancy. Stevenson's analysis is possibly the first quantitative discussion of wave height as a (square root) function of fetch, and his paper is one of the first quantitative studies of wind speeds in the planetary boundary layer.

Modern analysis of Stevenson's formula indicates that it appears to conservatively estimate wave heights for wind speeds up to around 30 miles per hour, being based on his observations which most likely were taken for fetch lengths under 100 kilometres, without fully developed seas. The breakwater at Wick was exposed to a fetch length of approximately 500 kilometres, and wind speeds far in excess of 30 miles per hour, prior to its eventual destruction.

In 1965, the South African engineer Basil Wrigley Wilson proposed a method which can be used to approximate the significant wave height H_{1/3} and period T_{1/3} of wind waves generated by a constant wind of speed U blowing over a fetch length F. The units for these quantities are as follows:

- H_{1/3} in metres (m)
- T_{1/3} in seconds (s)
- U in metres per second (m/s)
- F in metres (m)

Wilson's formulae apply when the duration of the wind blowing is sufficiently long, as when the wind blows for only a limited time, waves cannot attain the full height and period corresponding to the wind speed and fetch length. Under conditions were the wind blows for a sufficiently long time, for example during a prolonged storm, the wave height and period can be calculated as follows:

$$gH_{1/3} / U^2 = 0.30 \left\{1-\left[1+0.004 \left(gF/U^2\right)^{1/2}\right]^{-2}\right\}$$
$$gT_{1/3} / (2\pi U) = 1.37 \left\{1-\left[1+0.008 \left(gF/U^2\right)^{1/3}\right]^{-5}\right\}$$

In these formulae, g denotes the acceleration due to gravity, which is approximately 9.807 m/s^{2}. The wind speed U is measured at an elevation of 10 metres above the sea surface. For conditions approximate to those for the Wick breakwater during a storm (fetch length of 500km, wind speed of around 75mph), the graph below shows that Wilson's method predicts a significant wave height (H_{1/3}) of around 1.5 times that of Stevenson's.

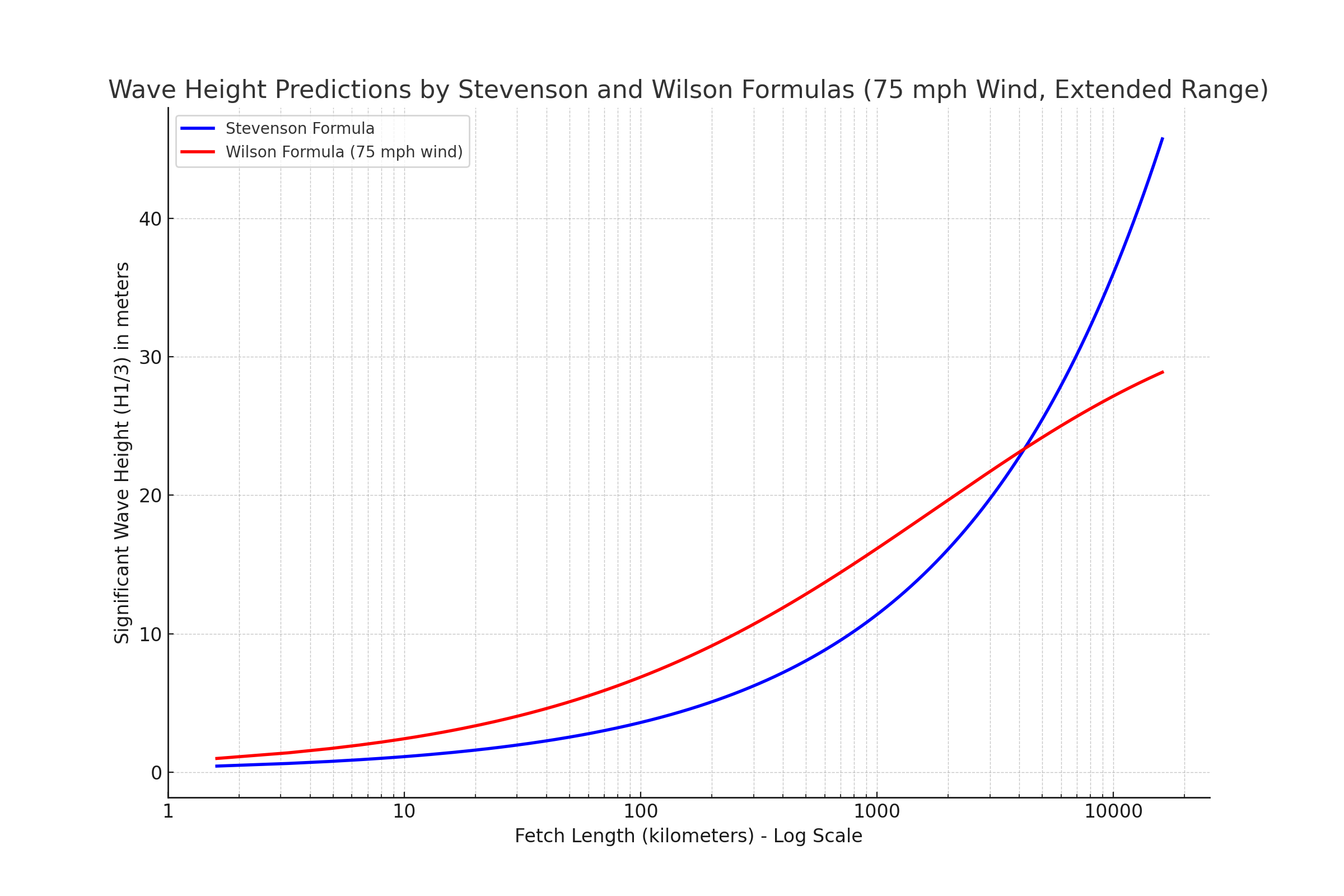
A graph showing significant wave height (H_{1/3}) in metres predicted using the formulae of Wilson (1965) and Stevenson (1852) for a 75mph (33.528m/s) wind

Nonetheless, whilst Stevenson's formula is highly limited and unsuitable for engineering design application, it was notable for being an early attempt to apply mathematical theory to hydraulic engineering problems, and shows some limited agreement (albeit within a narrow range) with a more advanced formula developed by Ramón Iribarren in 1942. A major flaw in Stevenson's formula is the absence of consideration of wind speed, and comparison with Wilson's formula at 3 different wind speeds (30, 50 and 75mph) shows only a reasonable level of agreement for 50mph winds at fetch lengths up to around 100 metres.

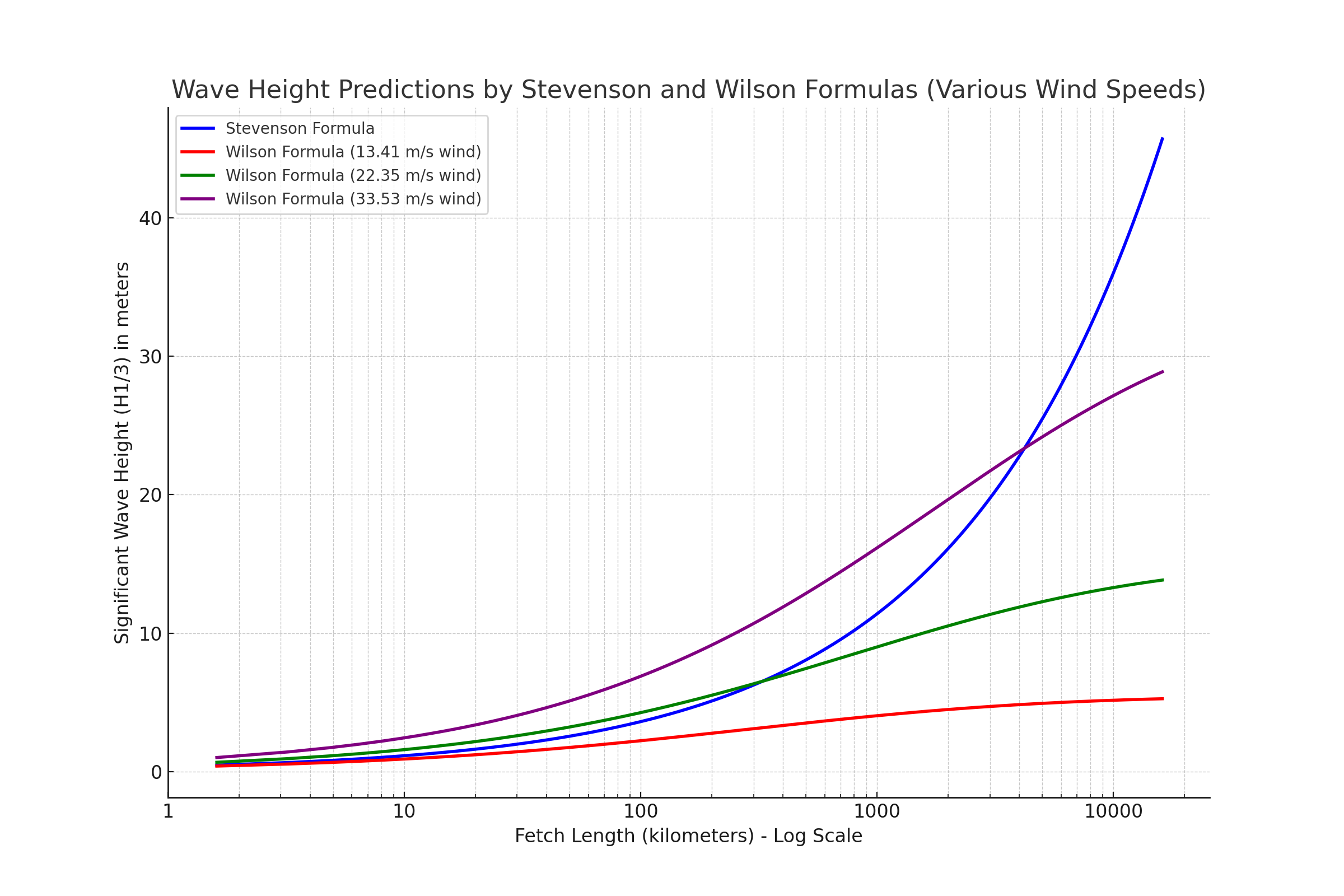
Comparison of wave height (H1/3) prediction in metres using Stevenson and Wilson formula for 3 different wind speeds

Stevenson himself noted that the formula was an approximation, and actively encouraged further research into similar problems, imploring young engineers to redouble efforts in the advancement of coastal engineering during an 1885 address to the Institution of Civil Engineers in London. In addition to his work on wave growth, he also undertook research into the phenomenon of wave decay inside harbour basins.

=== The breakwater at Wick, Caithness ===
Stevenson designed and supervised the construction of a breakwater at Wick in 1863, which at the time was the largest herring fishery in Europe. The inner harbour, designed by Thomas Telford, was completed in 1811, followed by the construction of the expanded outer harbour by James Bremner between 1825 and 1834. However, by 1857, the need for increased capacity became evident, leading the British Fishery Society to propose a new breakwater. In 1862 Stevenson, along with his brother David, prepared detailed plans, sections, and specifications for the harbour's extension. This design received support from Sir John Coode and John Hawkshaw. A loan of £62,000 was sanctioned by A. M. Rendel, the engineer for the Public Works Loan Commission.

Construction commenced in April 1863, aiming for a final length of 460 metres. Stevenson's design featured a rubble mound extending to 5.5 metres above the low water mark, following the Crane Rocks. This was capped with block walls and in-filled with rubble, providing a superstructure up to 16 metres wide. The rubble for the mound was sourced from local quarries and transported by steam locomotives. This was then deposited onto the breakwater mound using travelling gantries that ran along the staging, marking a possible first in Scotland for this technique. The seaward wall was constructed with a 6:1 batter. Below the waterline, the blocks were dry-jointed, whereas above the high-water mark, initially Roman and later Portland cement mortar was used.

The breakwater failed progressively as a result of several storms, including a storm in 1868 which destroyed a 250 ft (76 m) length of the constructed works, and by 1870 it had lost one third of its entire length. It was eventually abandoned in 1877, after further severe storm damage, despite repeated failed attempts at its reconstruction. Stevenson noted, in correspondence with the Institution of Civil Engineers, that a single storm had at one stage removed 1,350 tonnes of material from the breakwater, but he was unable to provide the height of the waves during the event.

Applying present-day techniques to calculate local wave conditions demonstrates that the breakwater as built would not have survived without mobilising additional restraint, or a mechanism to abate wave forces. Stevenson's own wave formula would have predicted offshore wave heights for Wick of around 8 to 10 metres, whereas modern observations show that the North Sea exhibits wave heights of up to two to three times this figure.

== Family ==
He was brother of the lighthouse engineers Alan and David Stevenson, between 1854 and 1886 he designed many lighthouses, with his brother David, and then with David's son David Alan Stevenson.

He married Margaret Isabella "Maggie" Balfour in 1848, daughter of Rev Lewis Balfour. Their son was the writer Robert Louis Stevenson, who initially caused him much disappointment by failing to follow the engineering interests of his family.

His wife's younger brother, James Melville Balfour (i.e. his brother-in-law), trained under D. & T. Stevenson and then emigrated to New Zealand, where he was first the marine engineer for Otago Province before he was appointed Colonial Marine Engineer.

== Lighthouses designed by Thomas Stevenson ==
- Whalsay Skerries (1854)
- Out Skerries (1854)
- Muckle Flugga (1854)
- Davaar (1854)
- Ushenish (1857)
- South Rona (1857)
- Kyleakin (1857)
- Ornsay (1857)
- Sound of Mull (1857)
- Cantick Head (1858)
- Bressay (1858)
- Ruvaal (1859)
- Corran Point (1860)
- Fladda (1860)
- McArthur's Head (1861)
- St Abb's Head (1862)
- Butt of Lewis (1862)
- Holborn Head (1862)
- Monach Islands (1864)
- Skervuile (1865)
- Auskerry (1866)
- Lochindaal (1869)
- Scurdie Ness (1870)
- Stour Head (1870)
- Dubh Artach (1872)
- Turnberry Point (1873)
- Chicken Rock (1875)
- Lindisfarne (1877, 1880)
- Fidra (1885)
- Oxcar (1886)
- Ailsa Craig (1886)

== Gallery ==
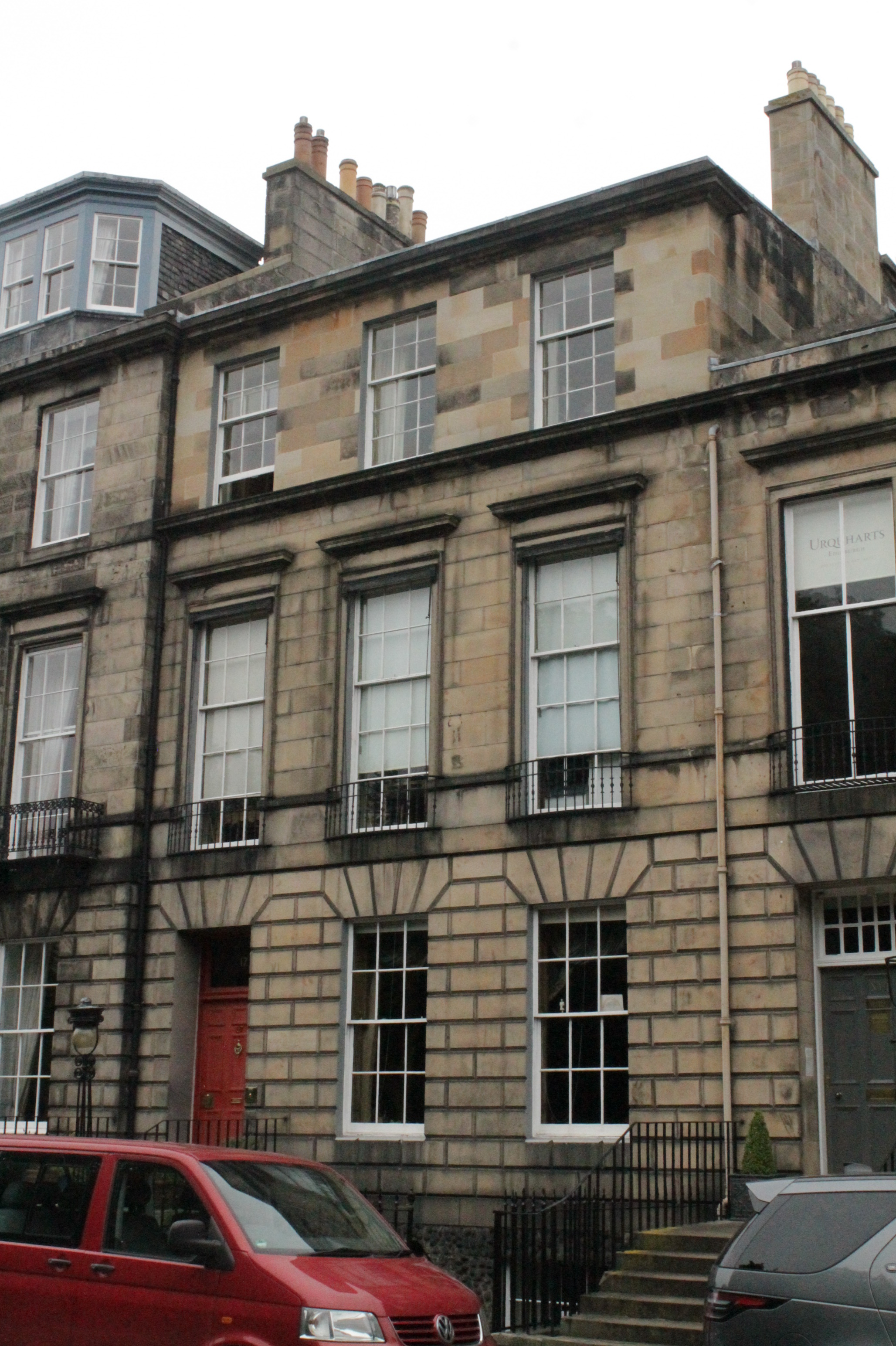
Townhouse at 17 Heriot Row, Edinburgh

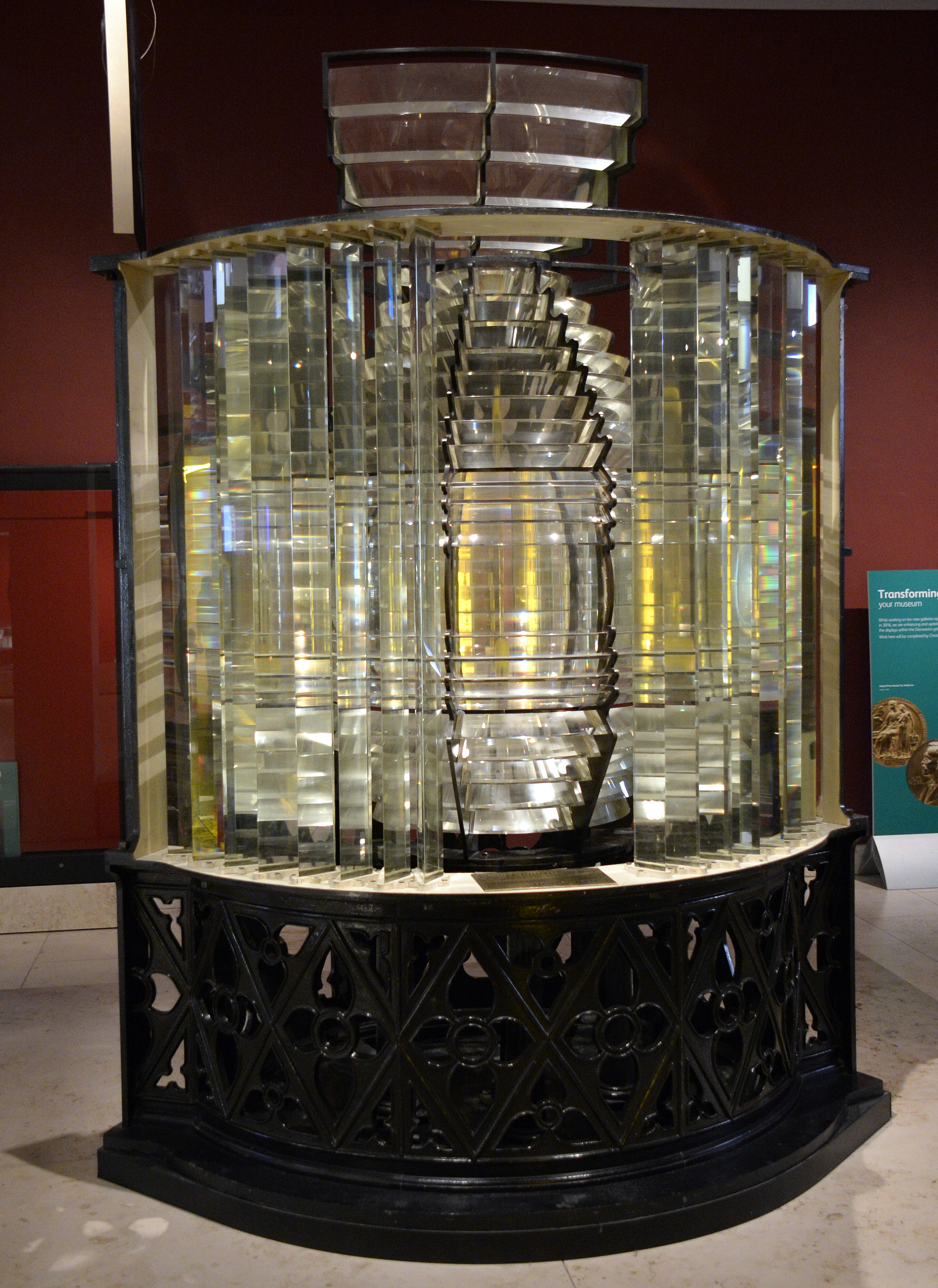
Condensing light. Lighthouse optic, designed by Thomas Stevenson. Chance Brothers and Company, Birmingham, 1866. National Museum of Scotland, Edinburgh

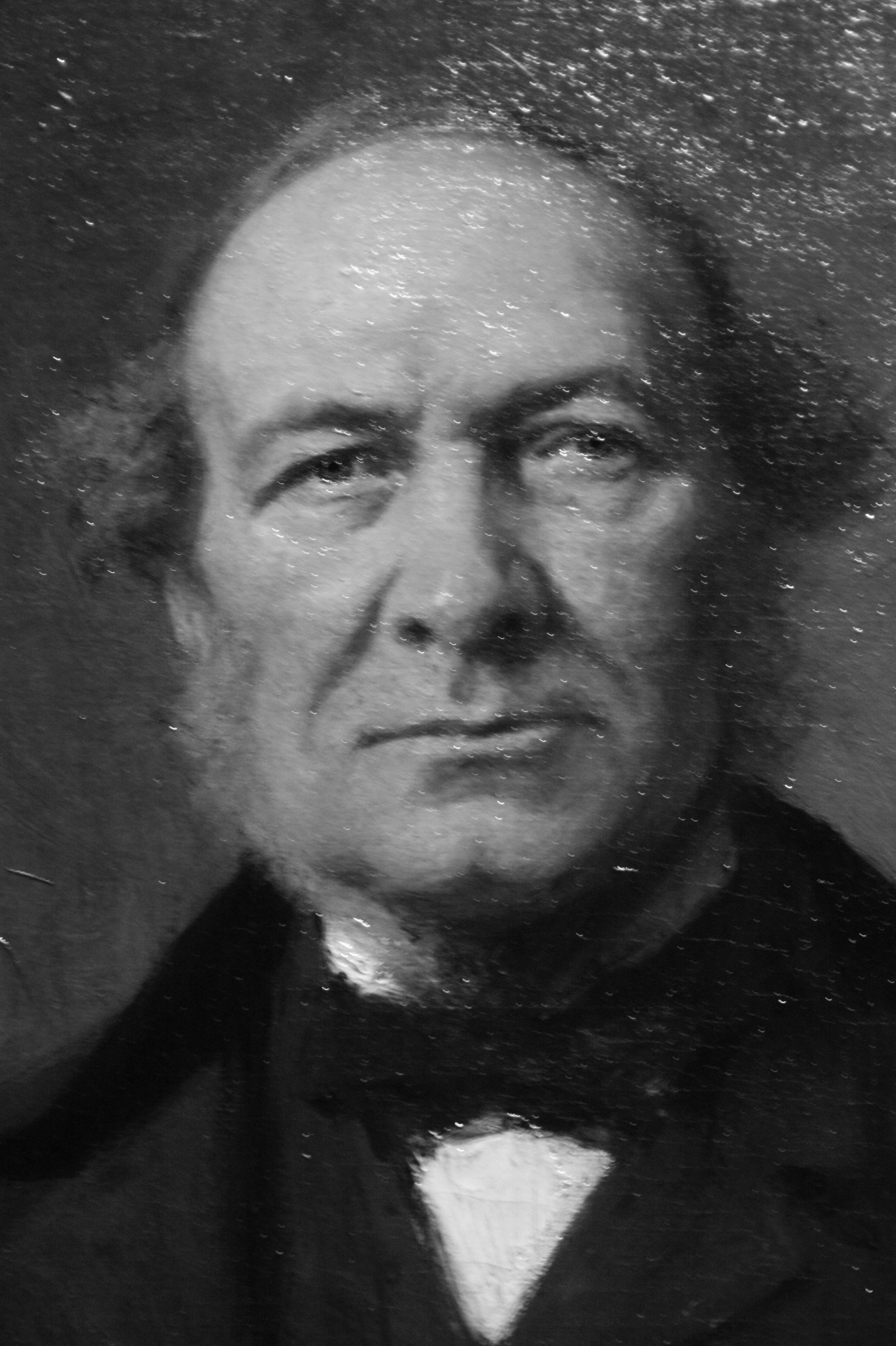
Thomas Stevenson by Sir George Reid, 1878

== See also ==
- Richard Henry Brunton, "father of Japanese lighthouses"
- John Richardson Wigham, Irish inventor and lighthouse engineer
