= David Stevenson (engineer) =

Scottish lighthouse designer (1815–1886)

David Stevenson FRSE FRSSA MICE
- Born: 11 January 1815; Edinburgh, Scotland
- Died: 17 July 1886 (aged 71); North Berwick, Scotland
- Resting place: Dean Cemetery
- Education: University of Edinburgh
- Occupation: Lighthouse engineer
- Employer: Northern Lighthouse Board
- Spouse: Elizabeth Mackay (m. 1840)
- Children: 3, including David and Charles
- Father: Robert Stevenson
- Relatives: Thomas Stevenson (brother); Alan Stevenson (brother); Robert Louis Stevenson (nephew)

David Stevenson MICE FRSE FRSSA (11 January 1815 – 17 July 1886) was a Scottish civil engineer and lighthouse designer who designed over 30 lighthouses in and around Scotland, and helped continue the dynasty of lighthouse engineering founded by his father, Robert Stevenson.

== Early life and education ==
He was born on 11 January 1815 at 2 Baxters Place at the top of Leith Walk in Edinburgh, the son of Jean Smith and engineer Robert Stevenson. He was brother of the lighthouse engineers Alan and Thomas Stevenson. He was educated at the High School in Edinburgh then studied at the University of Edinburgh.

== Career ==
In 1838 he became a partner in his father's (and uncle's) firm of R & A Stevenson. He acquired practical skills in millwright workshops, which inspired him to advocate for hands-on training for engineers in later life.

In 1835, he was asked by Isambard Kingdom Brunel to join his staff at the Thames Tunnel works, an offer which he could not accept as he had been appointed to superintend the construction of other works.

In 1844 he was elected a Fellow of the Royal Society of Edinburgh, his proposer being David Milne-Home. He was elected as a member of the Institution of Civil Engineers in 1844, and subsequently acted as a member of its council from 1877 until 1883, when he retired due to ill health. He was also a member of the Société des ingénieurs civils de France.

In 1853 he moved to the Northern Lighthouse Board. Between 1854 and 1880 he designed many lighthouses, all with his brother Thomas. In addition he helped Richard Henry Brunton design lighthouses for Japan, inventing a novel method for allowing them to withstand earthquakes. His sons David Alan Stevenson and Charles Alexander Stevenson continued his work after his death, building nearly thirty further lighthouses.

In 1836 he made a tour of the United States and Canada, subsequently publishing a book on North American civil engineering in 1838. In 1842 he published A treatise on the application of Marine Surveying and Hydrometry to the practice of Civil Engineering, which focused on how engineers could acquire accurate data on which to form designs for harbour and river improvements.

In 1858, his book The principles and practices of canal and river engineering was published. It was re-issued in a second expanded edition in 1872. The book provided a detailed overview of various aspects of inland navigation, including the history, construction, and maintenance of barge and ship canals.

The book also focused on the engineering challenges of canal construction and explored the physical characteristics of rivers, their compartments, and the various engineering works for their improvement, such as tidal flow, removal of obstructions, dredging, and the reclamation and protection of land.

In the 1860s he lived at 25 Royal Terrace, Edinburgh.

Non-lighthouse engineering included the Edinburgh and Leith Sewerage Scheme, the widening of North Bridge in Edinburgh, and work on the Liverpool and Manchester Railway. He played a significant role in developing harbours and rivers in Scotland, including works on the Forth, Tay, Ness, Nith, and Clyde. In Ireland, he contributed to the improvement of the Erne and Foyle rivers.

Notable works in England and Wales included the Dee, Lune, Ribble, and Wear rivers, along with the restoration and enlargement of the Foss Dyke in Lincolnshire. The Foss Dyke was thought to be the oldest canal still in use in Britain, although this has been disputed. This project involved widening and deepening the navigation channel without interrupting traffic. Stevenson was also influential in matters related to salmon fishing in rivers and estuaries in Scotland, and he made a significant report on the subject for the Dornoch Fisheries in August 1842.

In 1868 and 1869 he served as president of the Royal Scottish Society of the Arts.

== Death and burial ==
He died in North Berwick on 17 July 1886. He is buried in Dean Cemetery in west Edinburgh. The grave lies on the north wall of the original cemetery backing onto the first northern extension.

== Publications ==
- Sketch of the Civil Engineering of North America (1838)
- A treatise on the application of Marine Surveying and Hydrometry to the practice of Civil Engineering (1842)
- The principles and practice of canal and river engineering (1872)
- The Life of Robert Stevenson (1878)

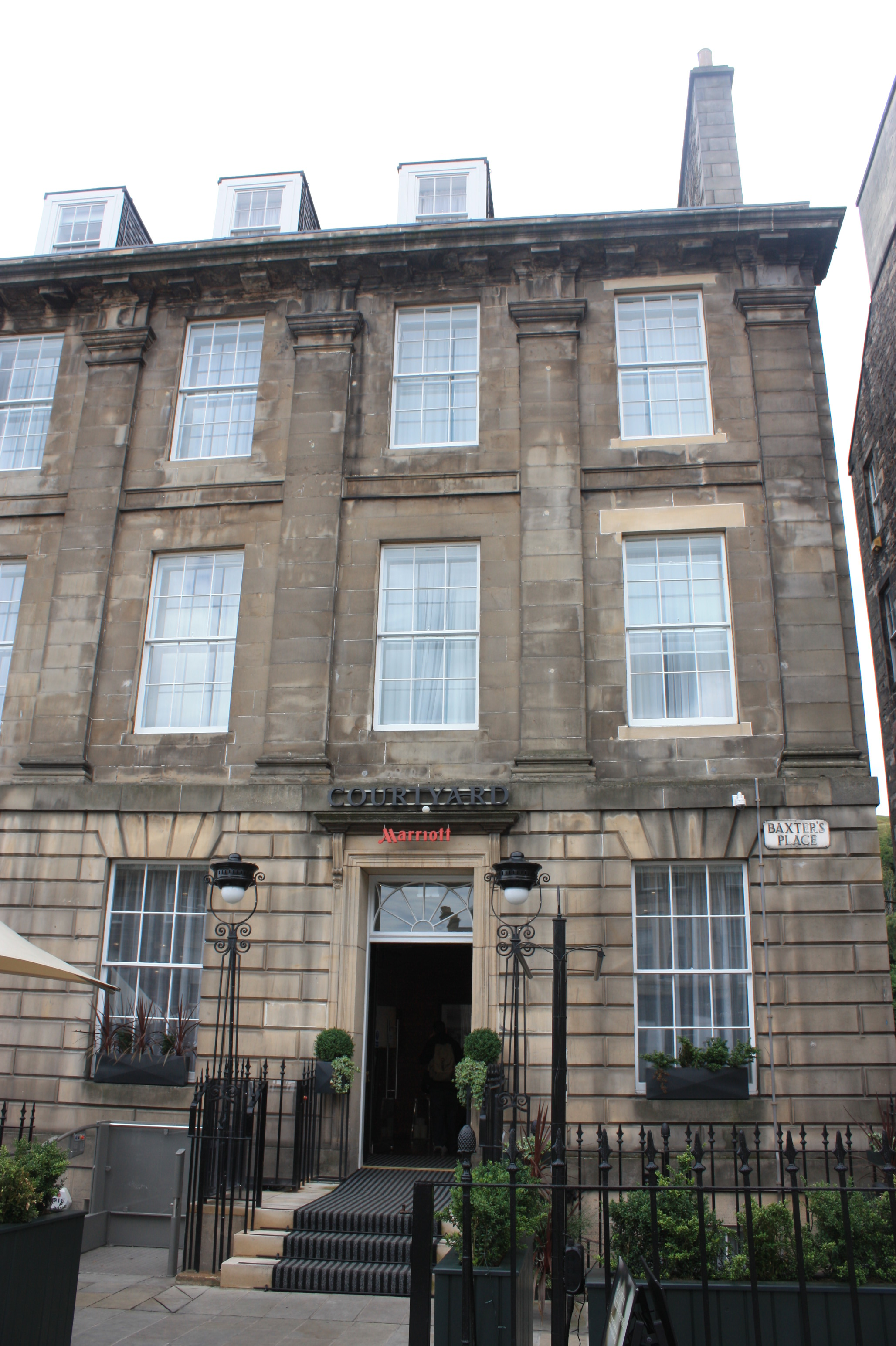
Baxters Place, Edinburgh

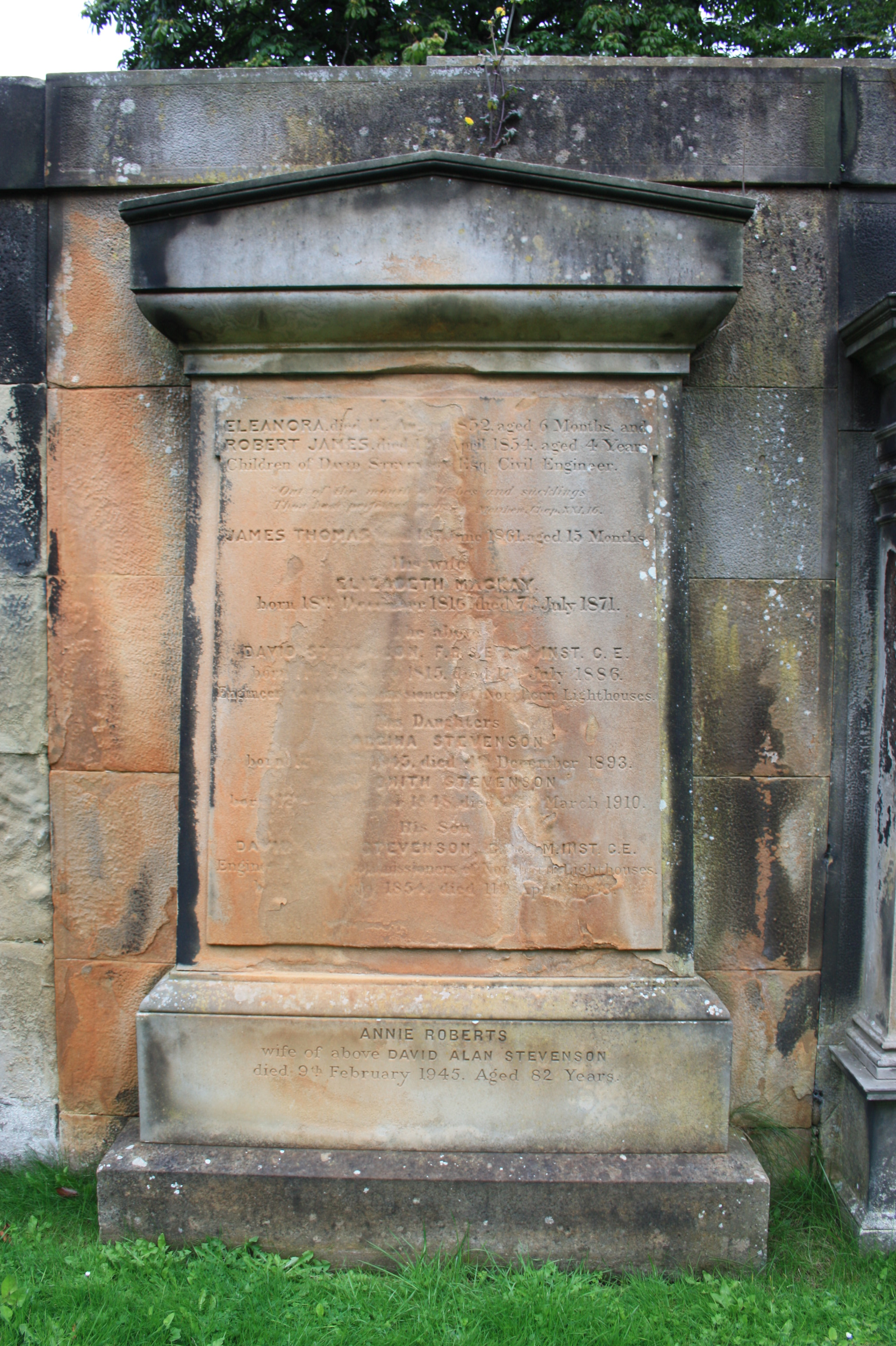
The grave of David Stevenson, Dean Cemetery

== Family ==
In 1840 he married Elizabeth Mackay (1816–1871). Their children included Charles Alexander Stevenson and David Alan Stevenson. His daughter Jane Stevenson (d.1909) married William Mackintosh, Lord Kyllachy.

His nephew was Robert Louis Stevenson.

== Lighthouses designed by David Stevenson ==
Scottish lighthouses constructed by David Stevenson
- Whalsay Skerries (1854)
- Out Skerries (1854)
- Muckle Flugga (1854)
- Davaar (1854)
- Ushenish (1857)
- South Rona (1857)
- Kyleakin (1857)
- Ornsay (1857)
- Sound of Mull (1857)
- Cantick Head (1858)
- Bressay (1858)
- Ruvaal (1859)
- Corran Point (1860)
- Fladda (1860)
- McArthur's Head (1861)
- St Abb's Head (1862)
- Butt of Lewis (1862)
- Holborn Head (1862)
- Monach Islands (1864)
- Skervuile (1865)
- Auskerry (1866)
- Lochindaal (1869)
- Scurdie Ness (1870)
- Stoer Head (1870)
- Dubh Artach (1872)
- Turnberry (1873)
- Chicken Rock (1875)
- Lindisfarne (1877, 1880)

== See also ==
- Richard Henry Brunton
