= Fishing industry in Scotland =

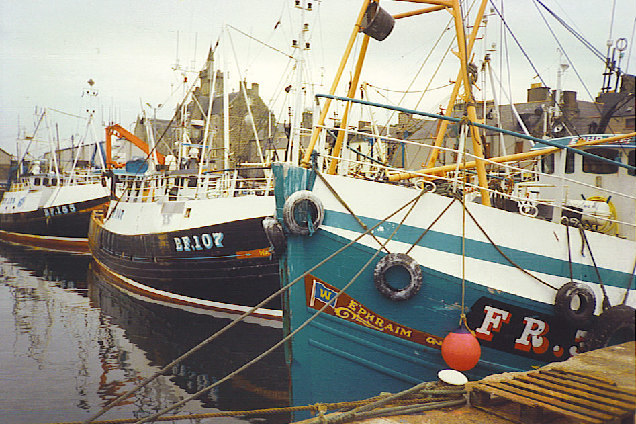
Scottish fishing boats moored in Fraserburgh

The fishing industry in Scotland comprises a significant proportion of the United Kingdom fishing industry. A recent inquiry by the Royal Society of Edinburgh found fishing to be of much greater social, economic and cultural importance to Scotland than it is relative to the rest of the UK. Scotland has just 8.4 per cent of the UK population but lands at its ports over 60 per cent of the total catch in the UK.

Many of these are ports in relatively remote communities such as Kinlochbervie and Lerwick, which are scattered along an extensive coastline and which, for centuries, have looked to fishing as the main source of employment. Restrictions imposed under the Common Fisheries Policy (CFP) affect all European fishing fleets, but they have proved particularly severe in recent years for the demersal fish or whitefish sector (boats mainly fishing for cod, haddock and whiting) of the Scottish fishing industry.

== Fishing areas ==
The main fishing areas are the North Sea and the seas west of Scotland.

== Historical development ==
Fish have been recognised as a major food source from the earliest times. Fishing was important to the earliest settlers in Scotland, around 7000 BC. At this stage, fishing was a subsistence activity, undertaken only to feed the fisher and their immediate community. By the medieval period, salmon and herring were important resources and were exported to continental Europe, and the towns of the Hanseatic League in particular. As the industry developed, "fishertouns" and villages sprang up to supply the growing towns and fishing became more specialised. The many religious houses in Scotland acted as a spur to fisheries, granting exclusive fishing rights and demanding part of their tithes in fish.

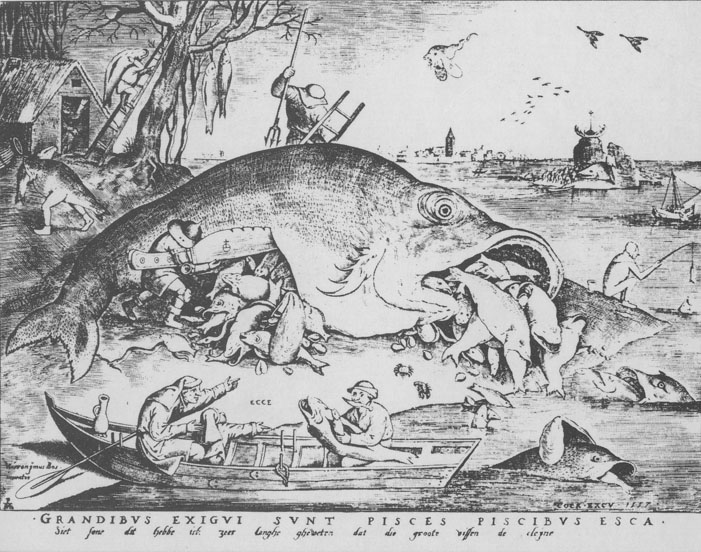
A medieval view of fishing, by Peter Brueghel the Elder (1556)

In the early 19th century, the British Government began to subsidise the catches of herring boats larger than 60 tons, plus an additional bounty on all herring sold abroad. This, coupled with the coming of the railways as a means of more rapid transport, gave an opportunity to Scottish fishermen to deliver their catches to markets much more quickly than in the past. Herring is considered a delicacy on the Continent and was caught relatively easily off the Coast of Scotland – off the East Coast during winter and spring, off the North Coast of Scotland and Shetland during the summer months and, in the autumn, off the Coast of East Anglia. At this time, there were as many as 30,000 vessels involved in herring fishing the East Coast, not to mention others in the Irish Sea.

At the peak of the Herring Boom in 1907, 2,500,000 barrels of fish (227,000 tonnes) were cured and exported, the main markets being Germany, Eastern Europe and Russia. The traditional method used for catching herring was the drift net. A long net in the form of a curtain was suspended from corks floating on the surface. The fish were trapped by the gills as they swam against the net. In the sheltered waters around Loch Fyne in Argyll, ring-netting for herring developed. The method involved surrounding a shoal of herring with a net and then pulling the ring tight to trap them.

Before the 1880s, long-lining was the usual method used to catch white fish such as cod, halibut, saithe, ling and flat fish which live at the bottom of the sea. It was very labour-intensive but resulted in a high-quality catch. Small line fishing was a family affair with women and children responsible for preparing the equipment. This was a line, up to a mile in length, to which were attached snoods or shorter pieces of line which were baited with fish or shellfish. Great line fishing was similar to small line fishing but was undertaken in deeper waters, further out to sea. The lines could be up to 15 miles (24 km) in length and would be fitted with 5,000 hooks. The fishermen usually baited the lines on the boat. Because of the work involved in preparing and hauling the lines, new methods of catching white fish were sought. Trawling was introduced into Scotland from England in the late 19th century and, from the 1920s, seine-netting was introduced from Denmark.

The First World War interrupted the growth of the industry with many fishermen enlisting the Royal Naval Reserve. They returned to a declining industry which was further interrupted by the Second World War in 1939. After 1945 much of the effort became concentrated on whitefish with an additional sector exploiting shellfish. Technical developments have concentrated fishing in the hands of fewer fishermen operating more efficient vessels and, although the annual value of catches continued to rise, the number of people working in the industry fell.

The fishing industry in Scotland continued to decline up to the Second World War, in terms of the numbers employed in the industry, with commercial fishing virtually grinding to a halt during the war years. The post-war years saw the development of a fleet heavily based on otter trawling, less involved in distant-water fishing than the English fishing sector.

== History of national waters ==
The concept of "freedom of the seas" has endured since the seventeenth century, when the Dutch merchant and politician, Hugo Grotius, defended the Dutch Republic's trading in the Indian Ocean, with the argument of "mare librum", based on the idea that fish stocks were so abundant that there could be no possible benefit obtained by claiming national jurisdiction over large areas of sea. His arguments prevailed, and freedom of the seas became synonymous with the freedom to fish. Countries such as Scotland had claimed exclusive rights to fishing in inshore waters as early as the fifteenth century, but there was no formal consensus as to how far off shore these areas extended. This ad hoc situation was codified by legislation in the 1930 Hague Convention on International Law. However, only Chile and Peru claimed more than a few miles of territorial waters. This system endured until the 1970s, when it became apparent to nations with large fishery resources that "their" stocks were being overexploited by non-local fishermen. The 1973 UN Conference on Law of the Sea allowed 200-nautical-mile (370 km) national limits, which were immediately claimed by a number of countries.

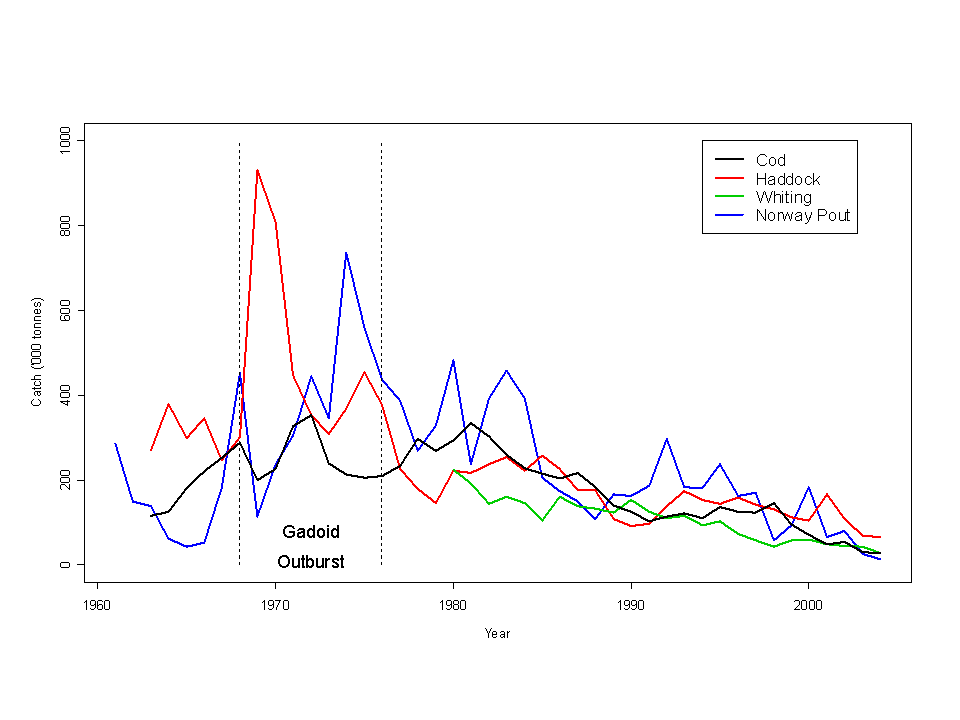
Trends in landings of Cod, Haddock, Whiting and Norway Pout from the North Sea (1961-2004)

== Gadoid outburst and Common Fisheries Policy ==
Fisheries are mentioned briefly in the Treaty of Rome.

"The Common Market shall extend to agriculture and trade in agricultural products. ‘Agricultural products’ means the products of the soil, of stockfarming and of fisheries and products of first stage processing directly related to these products."

Fisheries policy was seen, therefore, as an extension of the arrangements for agriculture, and the European Commission interpreted this as requiring a common policy dealing with fisheries. In 1968 the first proposals were put to the Council of Ministers for a Common Fisheries Policy (CFP). Implementation of the CFP was delayed by the difficulty in member states reaching agreement on the provisions of the legislation required. An agreement on the two regulations which make up the CFP was eventually reached on the night of 30 June 1970 - the day that negotiations were due to start for the accession of the UK, Ireland, Denmark and Norway. The six existing members were keen that a CFP should be in place before negotiations began and should therefore become part of the acquis communautaire, which new members would have to accept as settled policy.

The late 1960s and early 1970s were characterised by a sudden and unexplained increase in the abundance of a number of gadoid species (cod, haddock, whiting, etc.), the gadoid outburst. In this period the gadoid species in Scottish waters all produced a series of exceptionally strong year classes which have not been seen repeated in the intervening period. This great abundance, coupled with the price support system that subsidised fishermen when prices fell, contained in the CFP, lead to heavy investment in new boats, equipment and processing capacity in the Scottish whitefish fleet.

Britain's negotiating position was complicated by the conflicting interest of the inshore and distant water fishermen. The Scottish fleet had a strong interest in seeing the exclusive 12 mile (22.2 km) limit retained; but the UK Government was also pressed by the distant water fleet, mainly, but not solely based on the east coast of England, which wanted to continue fishing off Iceland, Norway and the Faroe Islands. The distant water fishermen were, of course, strongly opposed to any extension of territorial waters of any country, including the UK. The drama of the cod war with Iceland was still to come, with Britain's attempt to protect the interests of its distant water fleet. Compromise was reached when it was agreed that the applicant countries would retain their 6-mile (11 km) exclusive limits, and their 12-mile (19 km) limits subject to existing historical rights, for substantial parts of their coastline, preventing continental European vessels fishing in much of the Scottish west coast, including all of the Minch and Irish Sea. These limits have been renewed in legislation on two occasions, and although these rights are not a permanent feature of the policy, it is unlikely now that they will ever be extinguished, especially in the light of the need to conserve fish stocks.

In January 1977, at the behest of the EEC, the UK and other member states extended their Exclusive Economic Zones (EEZs) to 200 miles (370.4 km) or to the median line with other countries. This followed the extension of exclusive fisheries limits by Iceland, Norway, the United States and Canada to 200 miles (320 km). By this time Norway had decided by referendum not to join the EEC, as had the Faroe Islands, which, as a Danish dependency, had the option to join but did not do so. The 12-200 mile zone around Scotland, has never, therefore, been fished solely by the Scottish fishing industry, but is a direct consequence of the adoption of the CFP into British law.

The outcome of the negotiations was considered by fishermen's representative bodies at the time to be a success. The extension of the 12-mile (19 km) limit to the whole coastline (including St Kilda and North Rona and enclosing the Minch) gave Scotland one of the largest areas of inshore fishing in Europe, and the same limits as before entry to the EEC.

== Current status ==
Updated statistics from the UK's Marine Management Organisation on the UK fishing sector show that UK vessels landed 724 thousand tonnes of sea fish in 2017, with a value of £980 million. Scottish vessels accounted for 64 per cent of the quantity of landings by the UK fleet while English vessels accounted for 28 per cent. The current status of the fishing industry in Scotland is best considered on a sector-by-sector basis, as each faces different problems and opportunities.

=== Demersal fleet ===
The Scottish demersal fleet has been facing economically difficult times for several years due to the decline of cod and haddock in the North Sea, which were the mainstay of catches. The fleet has declined from around 800 vessels in 1992 to just over 400 in 2004. This sector catches a diverse range of species and, although cod and haddock are important components, together accounting for 40% of the total landings, in absolute value they represent only a modest turnover of £55m. Commercial performance of the sector has been dominated by the difficulties over cod, particularly in recent years with the implementation of the European "Cod Recovery Plan", but have also been affected by a scarcity of haddock and other demersal species. In recent years much of the demersal industry has been supported by the abundant 1999 year-class of haddock.

=== Nephrops fleet ===
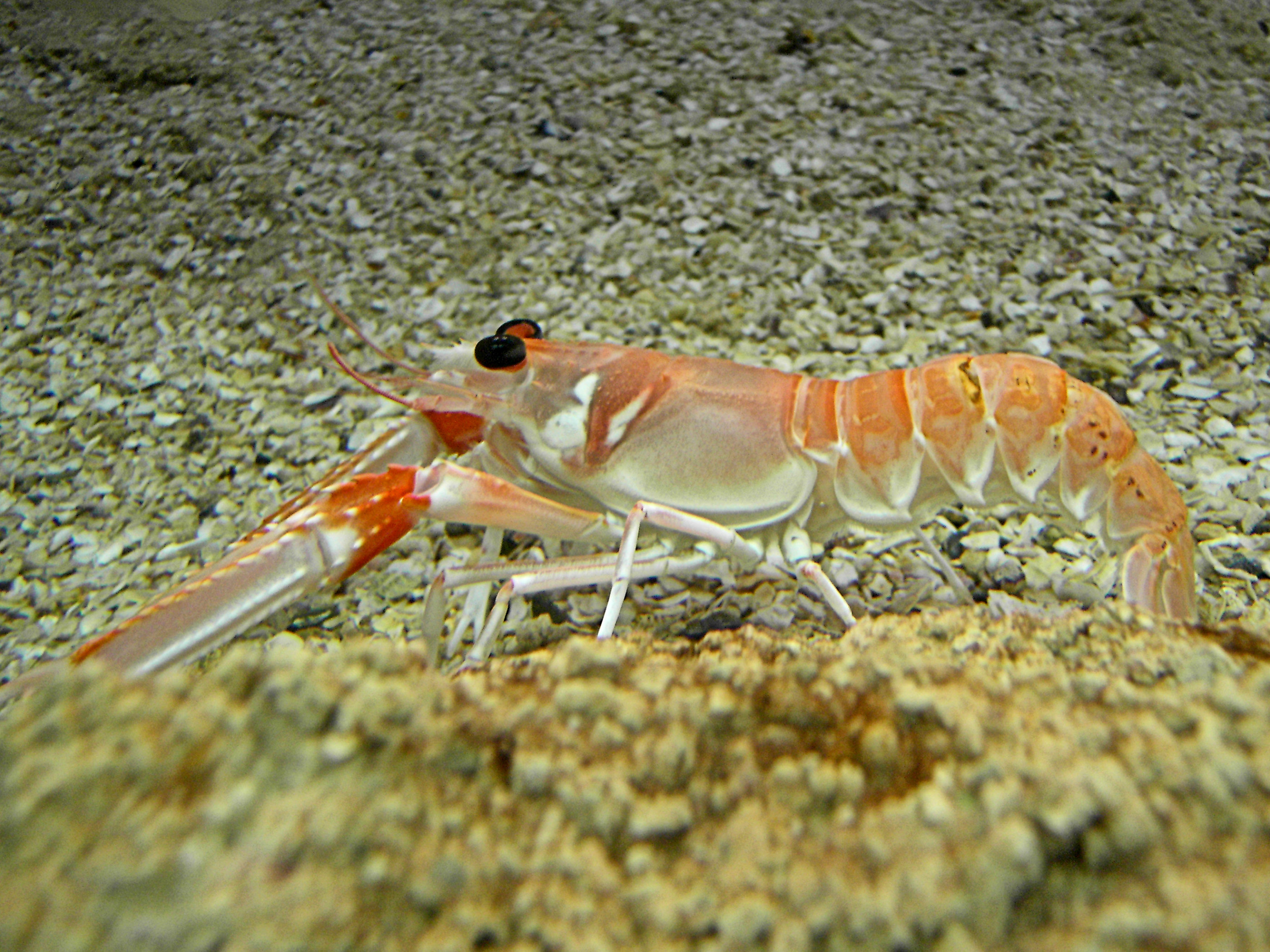
Nephrops norvegicus

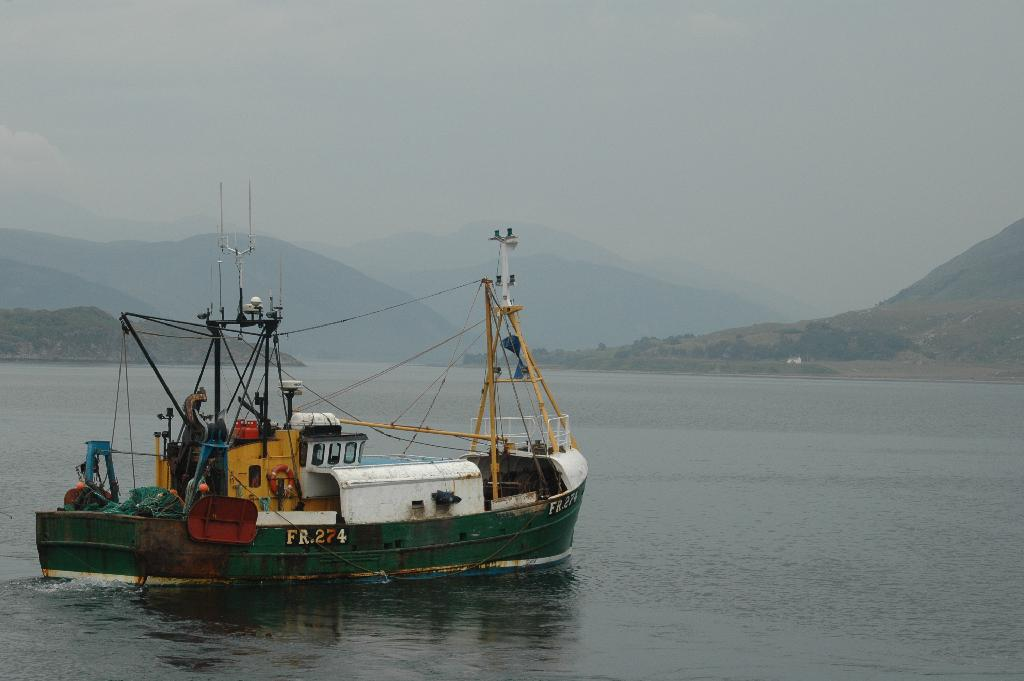
A small Nephrops trawler leaving Ullapool harbour

Nephrops norvegicus is a small crustacean better known as langoustine or scampi, and, by value, is the single most economically important species caught by the Scottish fishing industry, with landings in 2005 worth £38.5m, as compared to £22.4m for haddock, the next most significant species. The Nephrops fleet is varied in its makeup, with larger trawlers fishing in the central North Sea, and smaller vessels trawling in coastal waters, and significant landings coming from vessels fishing with creels or lobster pots, particularly on the west coast. Nephrops lives on patches of soft mud, in which it excavates burrow systems. The distribution of the species is therefore limited by the extent of these mud patches, which are found in the Firth of Forth, Moray Firth, the North and South Minches, the Clyde estuary, and the Fladen ground, in the centre of the North Sea. Juveniles and females spend most of their time inside these burrows, with males venturing out more frequently. This difference in behaviour, coupled with the inherent problem in measuring the age of crustaceans, means that standard stock assessment techniques cannot be used. Nephrops stocks are assessed by surveying their habitat with TV cameras to count the number of burrows. This is then used to calculate an average population density, and from their to calculate a biomass for a particular area. The total allowable catch is set as a proportion of this biomass. Nephrops stocks in the North Minch have decreased considerably in recent years (ICES). The creel fishery in Loch Torridon was first certified as sustainable in 2003 by the Marine Stewardship Council but the certificate was suspended on 11 January 2011.

=== Pelagic sector ===
The commercial performance of this sector suffered a near terminal setback during the 1970s, when the herring fisheries in the North Sea and west of Scotland collapsed and had to be closed. As stocks recovered and as it became possible to separate the catching of herring and mackerel, the sector recovered. It became apparent that the domestic market for herring had disappeared, and mackerel became the dominant source of earnings. These trends encouraged a number of enterprising fishermen to set about investing in the modernisation of the fleet through the commissioning of new, state-of-the-art vessels. The pelagic fleet is now highly centralised, based in Shetland and north east Scotland, with a fleet of 27 vessels generating gross earnings of £98M. The general view is that substantial profit and excellent returns on investment are being achieved by this sector. 2006 raids by the Scottish Fisheries Protection Agency (SFPA) on a number of fish processors revealed large-scale misreporting of landings by pelagic vessels. This led to the Scottish component of pelagic quotas being reduced for several years to "repay" this over-exploitation.

=== Fish processing industry ===
The Scottish fish processing industry accounts for 49 per cent of the turnover of UK fish processing industry. Geographical distribution of the turnover of the Scottish industry is 77 % around Aberdeen; 24% in central and southern Scotland; and 11 per cent in the Highlands and Islands. The industry forms an integral part of the fishing-based economy. It accounts for more jobs than the catching industry and aquaculture combined, with the added significance that it provides employment for women in otherwise male-dominated labour markets. Two distinct sub-sectors make up the processing industry: the primary processors involved in the filleting and freezing of fresh fish for onward distribution to fresh fish retail and catering outlets, and the secondary processors producing chilled, frozen and canned products for the retail and catering trades. The current situation of the processing sector reflects the fortunes of the catching industry. Those involved in processing pelagic fishes and shellfish (together with farmed fish) are expanding their operations, while those engaged in whitefish processing are in difficulty. One of the major problems facing the processing sector is the scarcity of labour in isolated rural communities. Difficulties in attracting local labour reflect the low pay, the seasonal or casual nature of employment and the poor work environment compared with office or supermarket jobs. The high turnover of labour and high levels of absenteeism experienced in some plants adds significantly to labour costs. As a result, firms are now turning increasingly to agency labour and the employment of unskilled (and occasionally illegal) immigrant workers.

== Associated organisations ==
The fishing industry in Scotland is supported by a number of governmental and non-governmental organisations.

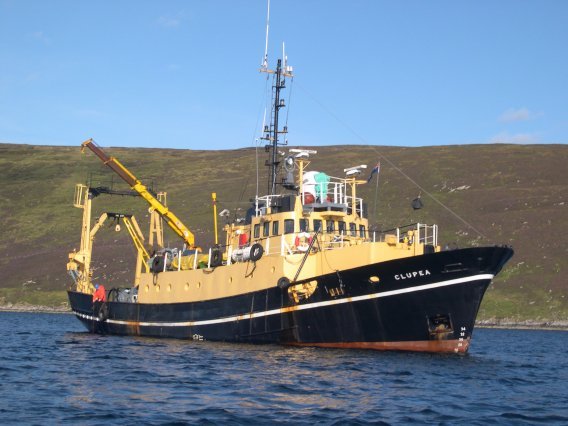
FRV Clupea

=== Fisheries research in Scotland ===
Fisheries research in Scotland dates back to the foundation of the Scottish Marine Station, near Oban and the Gatty Marine Laboratory at St Andrews in 1884. Government involvement in fisheries research began in 1899 with the foundation of the Aberdeen Marine Laboratory, now part of Marine Scotland. Marine Scotland operates two research vessels, the ocean-going MRV Scotia and the smaller inshore vessel MRV Alba Na Mara.

Non-governmental fisheries research is carried out at a number of Scottish universities and institutes, including deep-sea research at the University of Aberdeen's Oceanlab at Newburgh, marine mammal research at the University of St Andrews, research on the Clyde estuary ecosystem at the Millport Biological Station on the Isle of Cumbrae, and fisheries research at the Scottish Association of Marine Science (SAMS) near Oban, and the North Atlantic Fisheries College at Scalloway in Shetland, both part of the University of the Highlands and Islands project. Recently, the National Subsea Centre in Dyce, Aberdeen, has also been involved in fisheries research.

=== Industry organisations ===
There are numerous organisations representing different sectors of the industry, including the Scottish Fishermen's Federation (SFF), which was formed in 1973 from eight constituent local fishermen's organisations. The SFF lobbies for the interests of Scottish fishermen at national and international levels in Edinburgh, London and Brussels. The Federation also plays a role in fisheries science by coordinating industry cooperation with scientific partners. The different industrial sectors each have representative organisations, such as the Scottish Whitefish Producers Organisation or the Scottish Seafood Processors Federation.

In 2017 the Communities Inshore Fisheries Alliance was established to respond to common needs throughout the mobile, static, diving and landline fisheries and onshore fishing businesses in Scotland, currently its members include the Clyde Fishermen's Association, Western Isles Fishermen's Association, West Coast Scallop Association, Dunbar Fishermen's Association, Orkney Fishermen's Association, Galloway Static Gear Association and a range of fishing businesses and scientists representatives such as SAMS.

The SCFF is an organisation representing static creel, hand-line and dive fishing. (around 85 per cent of the Scottish inshore fleet are thought to be creel boats).

The promotion of fish and fish products along with economic analysis of fisheries is carried out by Sea Fish Industry Authority (Seafish) – a non-departmental public body funded by a levy on fish sales – and their Scottish partner organisation, Seafood Scotland.

=== Regulation and enforcement ===
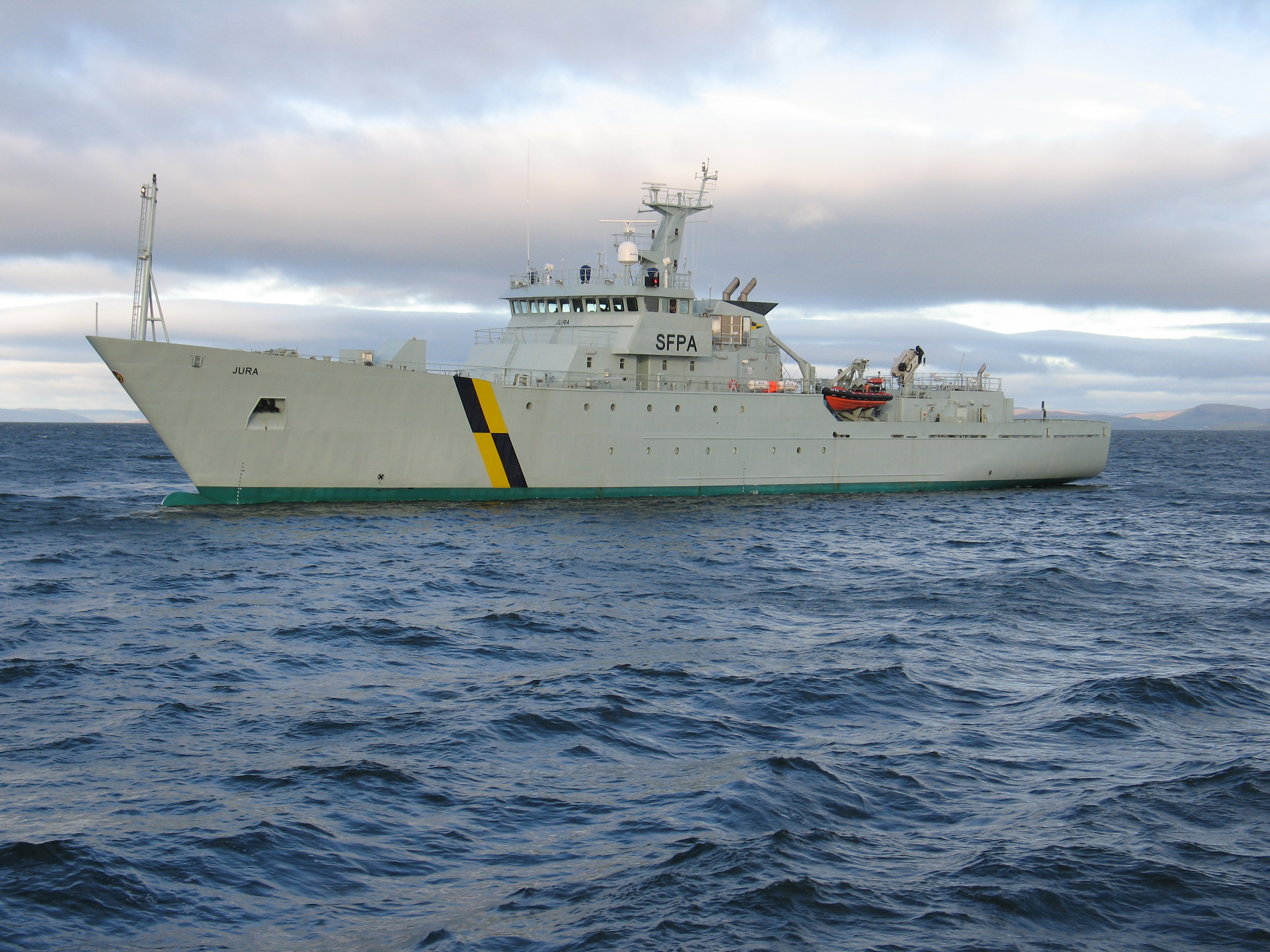
The Marine Directorate patrol vessel MV Jura

Whilst the international aspect of European fisheries negotiation, such as the setting of quotas, remain a reserved power, the implementation of fisheries regulations is devolved to the Scottish Parliament and is administered and enforced by the Marine Directorate.

== See also ==
- Economy of Scotland
- North Sea oil
- Scottish Fisheries Museum
- Whaling in Scotland
- North Atlantic Salmon Conservation Organization
