= Malin Sea =

Marginal sea

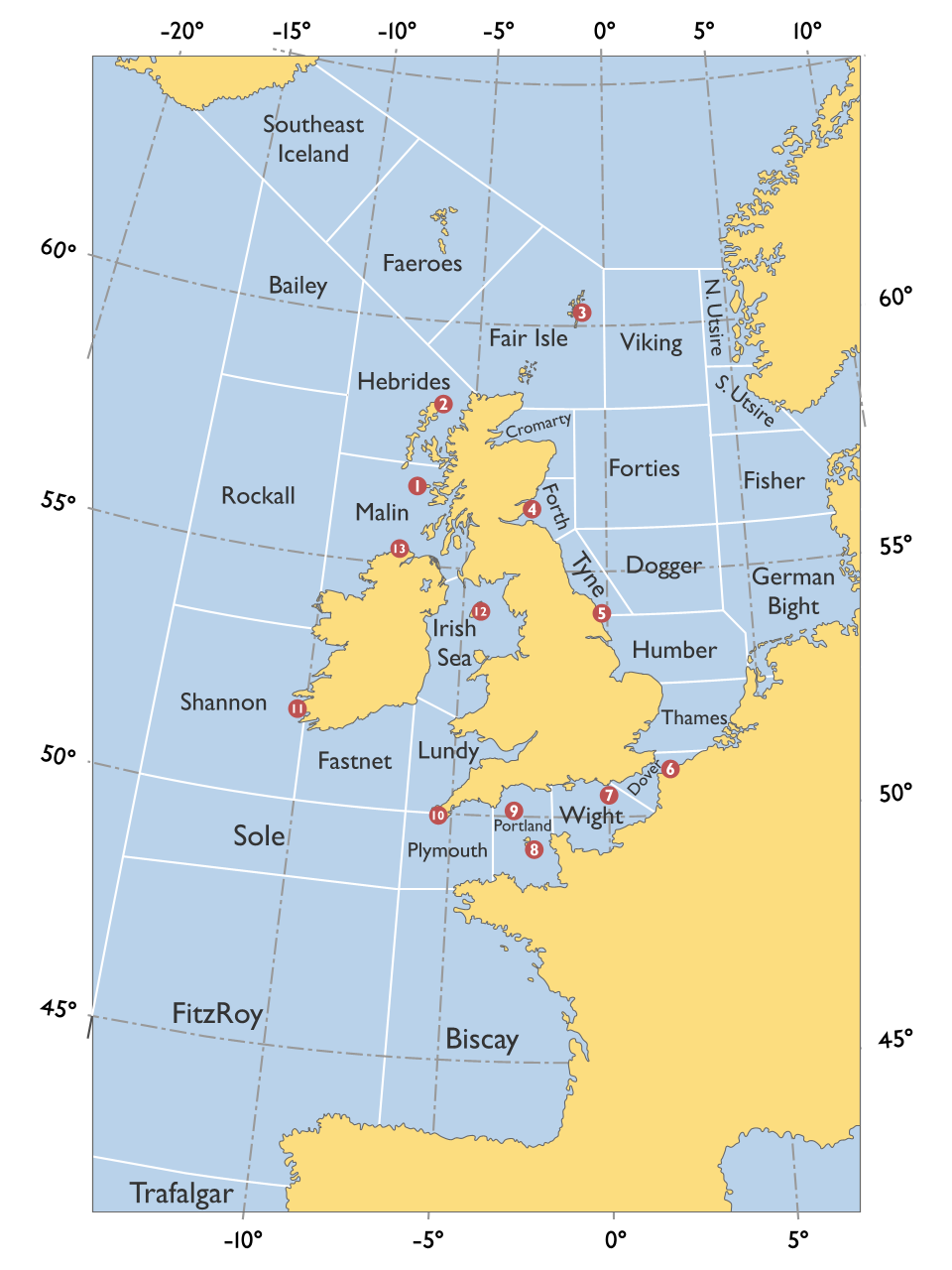
The Malin shipping forecast zone approximates the Malin Sea

The Malin Sea is a marginal sea of the North-East Atlantic over the Malin Shelf, the continental shelf north of Ireland and southwest of Scotland. It is connected to the Irish Sea by the North Channel, and overlaps the Inner Seas off the West Coast of Scotland. Of the UK Shipping Forecast areas, the Malin Sea covers most of Malin, and by some definitions extends into Rockall. The area is within the exclusive economic zones of Ireland and the United Kingdom.

== Extent ==
Different authorities give different limits for the Malin Sea. The 2002 draft of the International Hydrographic Organization's Limits of Seas publication lists "Malin Sea" as a synonym of Inner Seas off the West Coast of Scotland. Hardisty defines it separately from the Minches and Sea of the Hebrides, which are parts of the Inner Seas; Dormels interprets Hardisty's definition as corresponding to roughly the southern half of the Inner Seas. Banner defines it as "from the Irish Coast to lat. 56°20′N and from the Continental Shelf break to Kintyre, comprising an area of more than 14,000 km^{2} (5,000 sq mi)." Cooper et al. define the Malin Sea's southern limit as from Inishowen to Rathlin Island. The Scottish Government's Marine Atlas divides its coastal waters into habitats, one being "Minches and Malin Sea", defined as "north from the Mull of Kintyre to Cape Wrath incorporating the sea area between the Scottish mainland and the Western Isles".

== Name ==
The name "Malin Sea" comes from Malin Head, the northernmost part of the Inishowen peninsula in northwest Ireland. The name was used in scientific publications from the 1970s, and was agreed in 1998 by the signatories of the OSPAR Convention on environmental protection in the North-East Atlantic. The 2001 revised text of the Bonn Agreement on pollution in "the Greater North Sea and its wider Approaches" specifies the Malin Sea among the waters north and west of the North Sea within the remit of the Agreement.

== See also ==
- Celtic Sea, southeast of Ireland
- Seas west of Scotland, discusses fisheries

== Sources ==
- "Chapter 2: Geography, hydrography and climate" (PDF). Region III: Celtic Seas. Quality Status Report 2000 for the North-East Atlantic. OSPAR Commission. 2000. Archived from the original (PDF) on 6 July 2010.
- Dormels, Rainer (20–22 August 2010). Practice and policies of the use of binominals, endonyms and exonyms in the naming of sea bodies (PDF). International Seminar on Sea Names (16th ed.). The Hague. Archived from the original (PDF) on 29 May 2014.
