= West of Scotland =

West of Scotland may refer to:

- West of Scotland (Scottish Parliament electoral region), an electoral region of the Scottish Parliament
- Informally, an area comprising Argyll, Ayrshire, Dunbartonshire, Lanarkshire, and Renfrewshire
- West Central Scotland
- West of Scotland F.C.
- West of Scotland Cricket Club
- Seas west of Scotland

== See also ==
- West Scotland (Scottish Parliament electoral region)
