= Seas west of Scotland =

Area of the North Atlantic Ocean

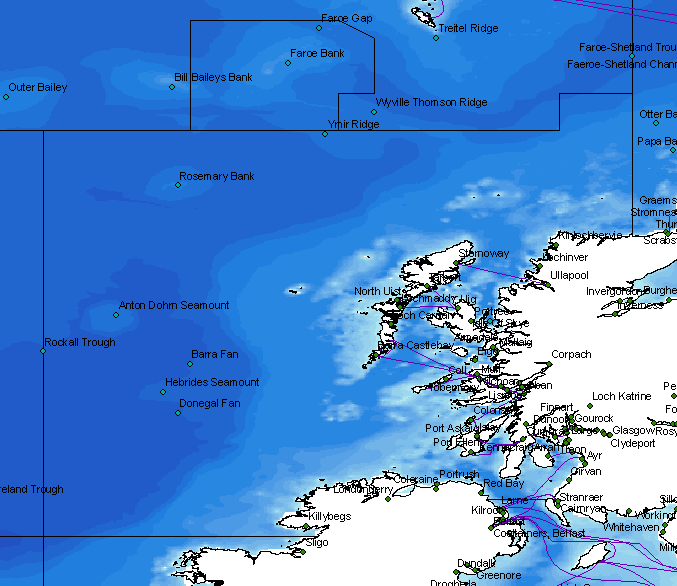
Map showing the International Council for Exploration of the Sea area VIa which effectively delimits waters west of Scotland

It is a central tenet of the EU maritime policy (Directorate-General for Maritime Affairs and Fisheries) that all seas have a particular nature, defined by their geography, their ecology, their economies and their people. Most seas are nested (e.g. Atlantic Ocean, Irish Sea, Morecambe Bay) and do not, except for specific purposes such as hydrography or fisheries management, have sharp, recognised boundaries. One important sea for purposes of fisheries management is referred to as the "seas West of Scotland". In line with the EU maritime policy, the sea does not only encompass the waters but also the people and economy of the areas bordering that sea.

== Extent ==
The entirety of the area has no specific name. It encompasses several marginal seas including the Malin Sea, the Inner Seas off the West Coast of Scotland, and the North Channel. It can be considered largely as the International Council for Exploration of the Sea area VIa whose easternmost boundary is nearly halfway between Cape Wrath and the Pentland Firth and whose southern extent to the west is in Donegal Bay. The border with the Irish Sea is at the level of Stranraer. The countries bordering these waters are Ireland, Northern Ireland and Scotland. As far as the EU's Marine Framework Strategy Directive is concerned the sea is part of the Celtic Seas. These should not be confused with the Celtic Sea which is further south.

== Governance ==
Map showing governance in UK part of seas west of Scotland. This map was originally produced by DEFRA in preparing for the UK Marine and Coastal Access Act

The UK's new Marine and Coastal Access Act will have limited direct influence on the waters west of Scotland because they are under the jurisdiction of the devolved administrations of Scotland and Northern Ireland (The Scottish Executive introduced a bill to their Parliament in April 2009 and one should be introduced to the Northern Ireland Assembly in 2012). However the Scottish and Northern Ireland governments are collaborating on a "marine policy statement" which is the first stage in marine planning. The objective is to complete all the consultations in time to have a Statement in place by November 2011.

== People ==
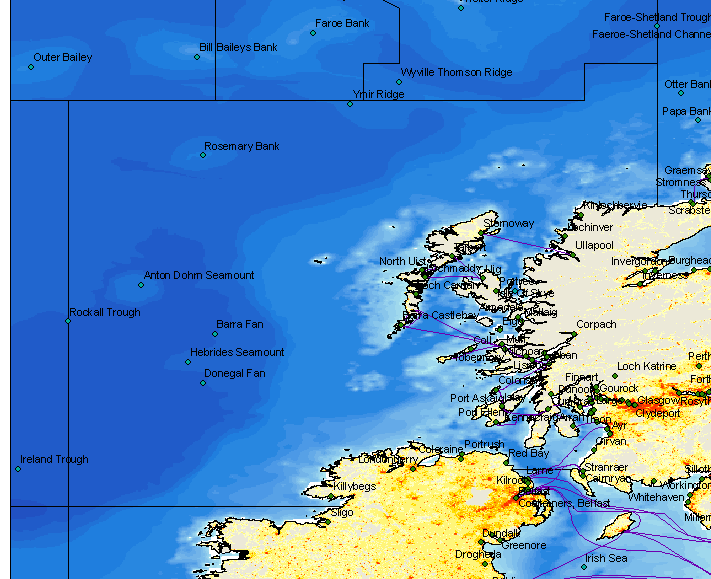
Map population density in area West of Scotland (data from Lanscan)

Most of the Scottish coast has a very low population. The significant exception is the Firth of Clyde and the river Clyde which is in the South West Scotland Region. This is navigable to Glasgow which is the heartland of industrial Scotland and was for a time world's pre-eminent shipbuilding centre. Greater Glasgow has a population of 1,200,000. The main coastal town of Northern Ireland bordering this sea is Derry which is on the northern coast and has a population of 237,000. County Donegal had a total population of 137,575 in 2002. Belfast, a major port and historic shipbuilding centre, is larger but is considered to be facing the Irish Sea.

The west of Scotland population is small in absolute terms and, other than Glasgow and its hinterland, what the Scottish statistical office term "remote rural" which means the people are greater than a 30-minute drive time to the nearest settlement with a population of 10,000 or more. We assume that this "remote rural" population can be used as a proxy for the coastal population. Neither the population as a whole nor the age distribution suggest that the population is declining. There is a deficit compared to the rest of Scotland in the 20–30 age group and a smaller one in the 30–40 group but, for school-age children and for those over 40 there is a net surplus. A possible explanation is that Scots leave rural areas for higher education and first job experience but these movements are compensated by English people in their 40s arriving to raise a family in wholesome surroundings. The proportion of inhabitants born in other parts of the UK is double that for Scotland as a whole.

place of birth of Scottish population
	Remote Rural	Accessible Rural	Rest of Scotland
Scotland	77%	80%	86%
Rest of UK	20%	17%	8%
Rest of World	3%	3%	6%

== Language ==
The coastline is part of the Celtic fringe. Gaelic is spoken as a minority language in many parts of the area with strongholds in the Outer Hebrides and Tyrconnel in Donegal. Scottish Gaelic is declining in Scotland although the compulsory teaching of the Irish language in Irish schools means that most Irish citizens understand it to some extent. The variant of Gaelic spoken in Donegal is distinctive, and shares traits with Scottish Gaelic. Its Gaeltacht (Irish speaking area) uses the West Ulster dialect. Inishowen, which lost its Gaeltacht areas in the early 20th century, used the East Ulster dialect.

== Fisheries ==
=== Sea fisheries ===
For the UK fleet as a whole, over the past 15 years there has been a sharp decline in demersal fishing, a fluctuating but relatively stationary situation for pelagic fish and an increase in Norway lobster (nephrops) fisheries. Since most of the pelagic and demersal fishing is carried out by North Sea-based vessels, it is the nephrops fishery that dominates the fisheries economy for ports facing the west of Scotland waters.

A number of alterations and new regulations were introduced to the UK and Scottish fisheries management regime in 2009 including a reduction in days at sea allocations, the Conservation Credits Scheme and the West of Scotland Management Measures. Interim measures were introduced between February and April, with the new schemes fully implemented from May onwards. Skippers interviewed in a survey thought that these restrictions did affect the way they fished and their costs. But these were not the major concern. Whitefish skippers were concerned about low quotas and low prices in equal measure. The nephrops skippers from the West of Scotland did not feel that quotas were a limiting factor but were very concerned with low prices. Although a minority thought the management measures affected prices, most admitted that the falling demand was mainly due to the recession and other forces affecting the market that are beyond the control of the Common Fisheries Policy.

Recovery is still some way off for the demersal fishery. Even with protective measures in place, cod is still being exploited through by-catches at a higher rate than recommended by scientists, haddock is being fished above the precautionary level and although the anglerfish is profitable, lack of scientific data means that the stock's ecological stability is unknown.

The nephrops fishery that has been growing in volume and value over the past five years to compensate for the declining whitefish. Fisheries scientists define the rate at which the stock is removed by fishing as the fishing mortality. ICES advise that the fishing mortality for nephrops should vary between F_{0.1}. and F_{max} which, for the stocks here, correspond to annual removal rates of 8.8% and 15.4% respectively. The Scientific, Technical and Economic Committee for Fisheries (STECF) believe that this is too lax and that the target should be F_{0.1}. Current exploitation rates are largely above F_{max} and therefore unsustainable. For 2009 the total allowable catch for regions VI and Vb was 18891 tonnes. STECF's advice in 2010 was to aim for lower catches.

Profitability in the fisheries sector is unlikely to come from greater volumes of landings in the foreseeable future. One can expect a pelagic catch that fluctuates about a mean at approximately today's level, little recovery in the demersal stocks and reduced nephrops landings.

=== Aquaculture ===
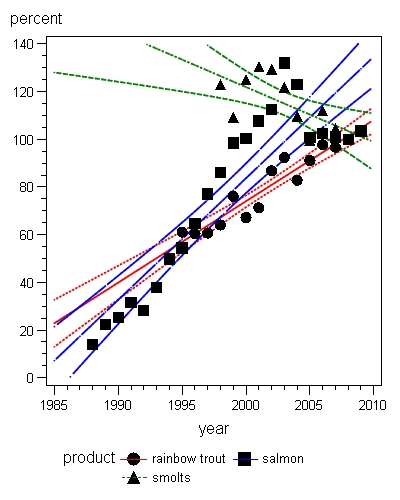
Production (mass of salmon and rainbow trout, number of smolts) expressed as percentage of 2008

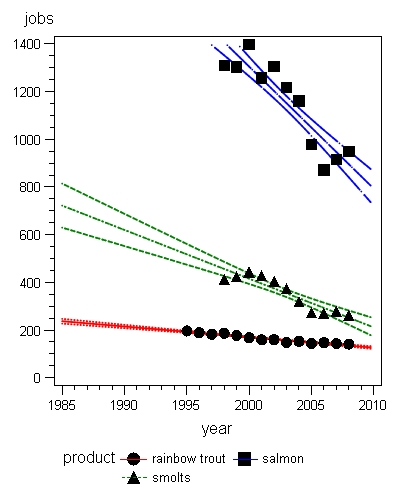
employment (full-time+part-time) for aquaculture in Scotland. Numbers do not include processing

Scotland is the largest producer of farmed salmon in the EU. It is the third largest producer in the world, behind Norway and Chile. Scotland is responsible for 80 per cent of UK aquaculture production.

In 2007 Scottish production of Atlantic salmon stood at 129,930 tonnes. This was followed by rainbow trout (7,414 tonnes), and smaller amounts of other species such as cod (1,111 tonnes), brown trout/sea trout (124 tonnes), halibut (147 tonnes) and Arctic charr (6.5 tonnes). The shellfish industry produced 4,850 tonnes of mussels; 3.5 million Pacific oysters; 283,000 Native oysters; 384,000 Queen scallops; and 60,000 King scallops. The aquaculture industry in Scotland is estimated to have a farm gate value of £346 million (2007). This includes £324 million for farmed salmon, about £14 million for rainbow trout, and around £5 million for shellfish. Brown trout, sea trout, halibut and Arctic charr are also farmed in Scotland. Aquaculture has grown remarkably in the past years.

The Renewed Strategic Framework for Scottish Aquaculture aims to implement the main aims of the May 2009 Communication i.e. promote the competitiveness of the EU aquaculture sector, ensure the sustainability of the sector and improve both the sector's image and its governance framework.

=== Wild salmon ===
Wild salmon are iconic creatures whose anadromous migrations require undisturbed pathways from highland streams to feeding grounds off Greenland. So their presence in Scottish rivers is not only a great tourist attraction but an indicator that conservation measures in all aquatic environments are working. This explains the general dismay at calamitous drops in returns to the rivers from the sea despite largely successful efforts at reducing fishing mortality through net bans and shorter recreational fishing seasons. It is generally accepted that the mortality is at sea although the reason is still unknown. Several explanations have been postulated but none are totally convincing: influence of aquaculture through escape of farmed fish or transfer of parasites (although most salmon rivers flow to the east of Scotland and most aquaculture is to the west), global warming (although salmon populations have survived temperature changes as significant as the present ones) or catching at sea (although few salmon are found in nets). The three year, €5.5 million SALSEA-Merge research funded by the EU Framework Programme and partner organisations (the Total Foundation and the Atlantic Salmon Trust) is investigating this question.

== Renewable energy ==
The waters west of Scotland are some of the most appropriate in Europe for offshore renewable energy: very strong winds, shallowish water and strong tides.

In 2009 consortia were awarded exclusive development rights over potential windfarm sites in Kintyre, Islay and the Arran Array for a total of 2.558GW over 524.98 km^{2} allowing the project developers to commence with further site surveys and investigations prior to submitting consent applications. On 8 January 2010, new 'Round 3' were rights granted in 9 UK coastal zones with a potential for 6,400 additional turbines generating 32GW which far exceeds previous plans. None of these areas are in waters west of Scotland.

The long distance from potential consumers of electricity and the consequent power losses along long transmission lines are the major challenge. A recent report into the investment needs for meeting UK needs in 2020 suggested that an investment of €2.7 billion was needed and that 70% of this would be for transferring Scottish-generated power southwards.

The long sea lochs on Scotland's western coast might be suitable for storing energy.

Even onshore renewable energy has a maritime aspect. Plans to build an onshore wind farm on the Isle of Lewis will require undersea cabling. These may cross marine protected areas and will therefore be subject to planning and licensing constraints.

== Ferries ==
Transport to the islands in the waters west of Scotland is largely assured by a ferry service that is run by CalMac Ltd which serves 26 routes. In 2006, it transported 5,3 million passengers, 1,1 million cars, 94 000 commercial vehicles and 14 000 coaches on these routes. The company is owned by the Scottish Executive and receives a subsidy of around £45 million a year to offer a lifeline service. In 2009 the European Commission found that, with the exception of the Gourock-Dunoon ferry, these subsidies did not break state aid rules . A review of the services was undertaken in 2009 with a view to providing a ferry service that will achieve more balanced growth across Scotland, to give the most remote areas of Scotland the chance to contribute to, and benefit from, sustainable economic growth and therefore give them the chance to succeed. So far no reports have neen made public.

== See also ==
- Fishing industry in Scotland
