= Irish Sea =

Sea between Ireland and Great Britain

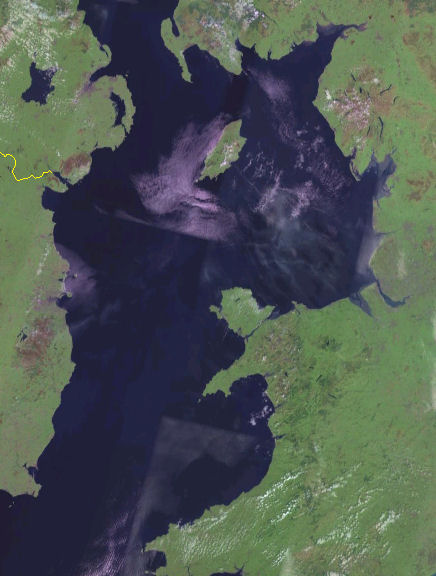
- Satellite image
- Interactive map of Irish Sea
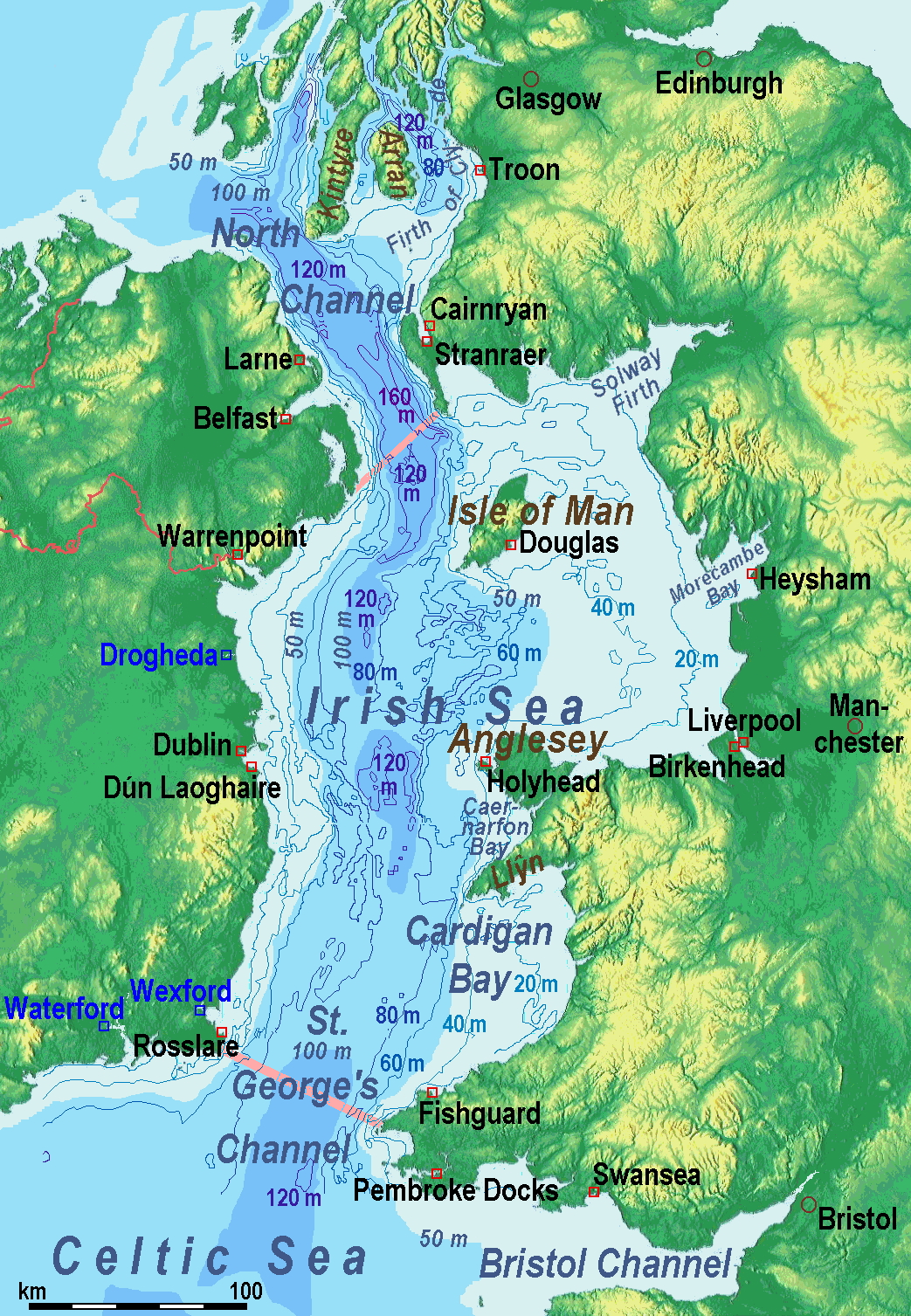
- Limits and ports: ◘ ferry port / ◘ freight only
- Location: Britain and Ireland
- Coordinates: 53.5°N 5.0°W
- Type: Sea
- River sources: Rivers that flow into the Irish Sea
- Ocean/sea sources: Celtic Sea
- Basin countries: United Kingdom; Ireland; Isle of Man
- Max. width: 200 km (120 mi)
- Surface area: 46,007 km^{2} (17,763 sq mi)
- Average depth: 80–275 m (262–902 ft)
- Water volume: 2,800 km^{3} (2.3×10^{9} acre⋅ft)
- Islands: Anglesey and Holy Island, Isle of Man and Calf of Man, Bardsey Island, Walney, Lambay, Ireland's Eye
- Settlements: (see below)

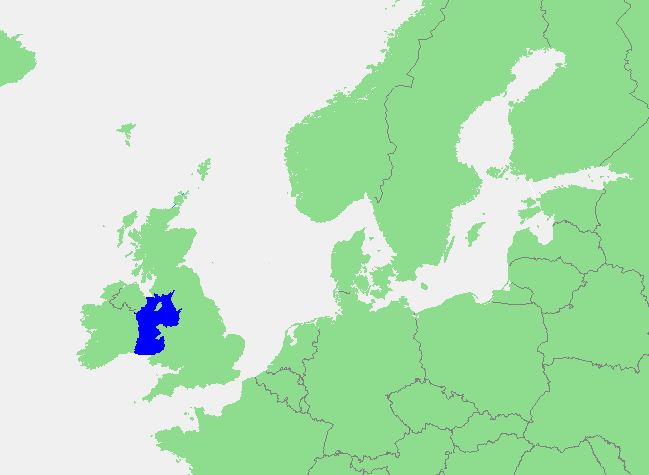
Location of the Irish Sea

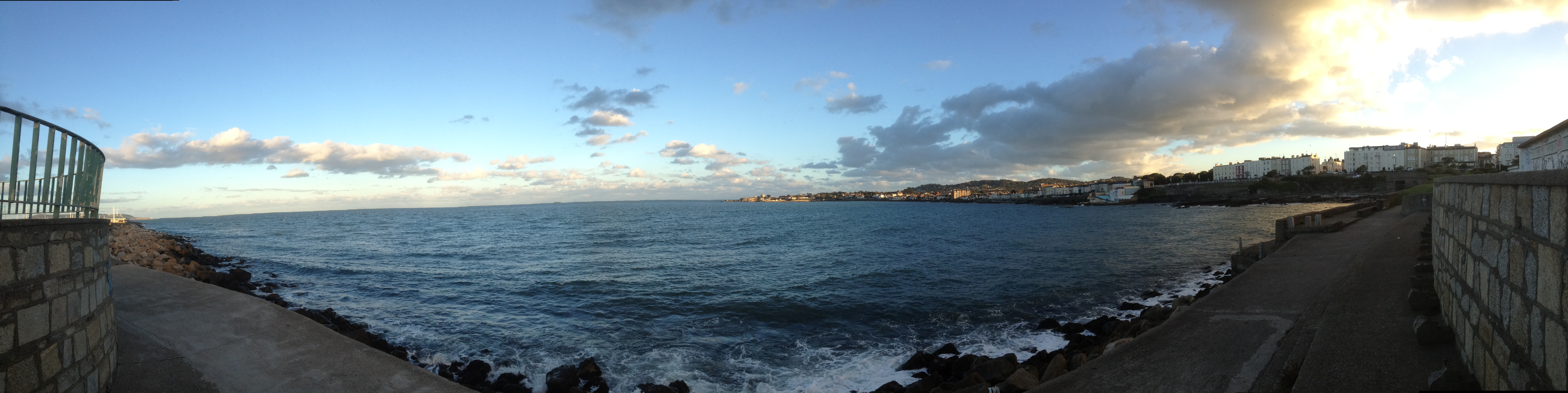
From the pier at Dún Laoghaire a suburban seaside town in County Dublin, Ireland

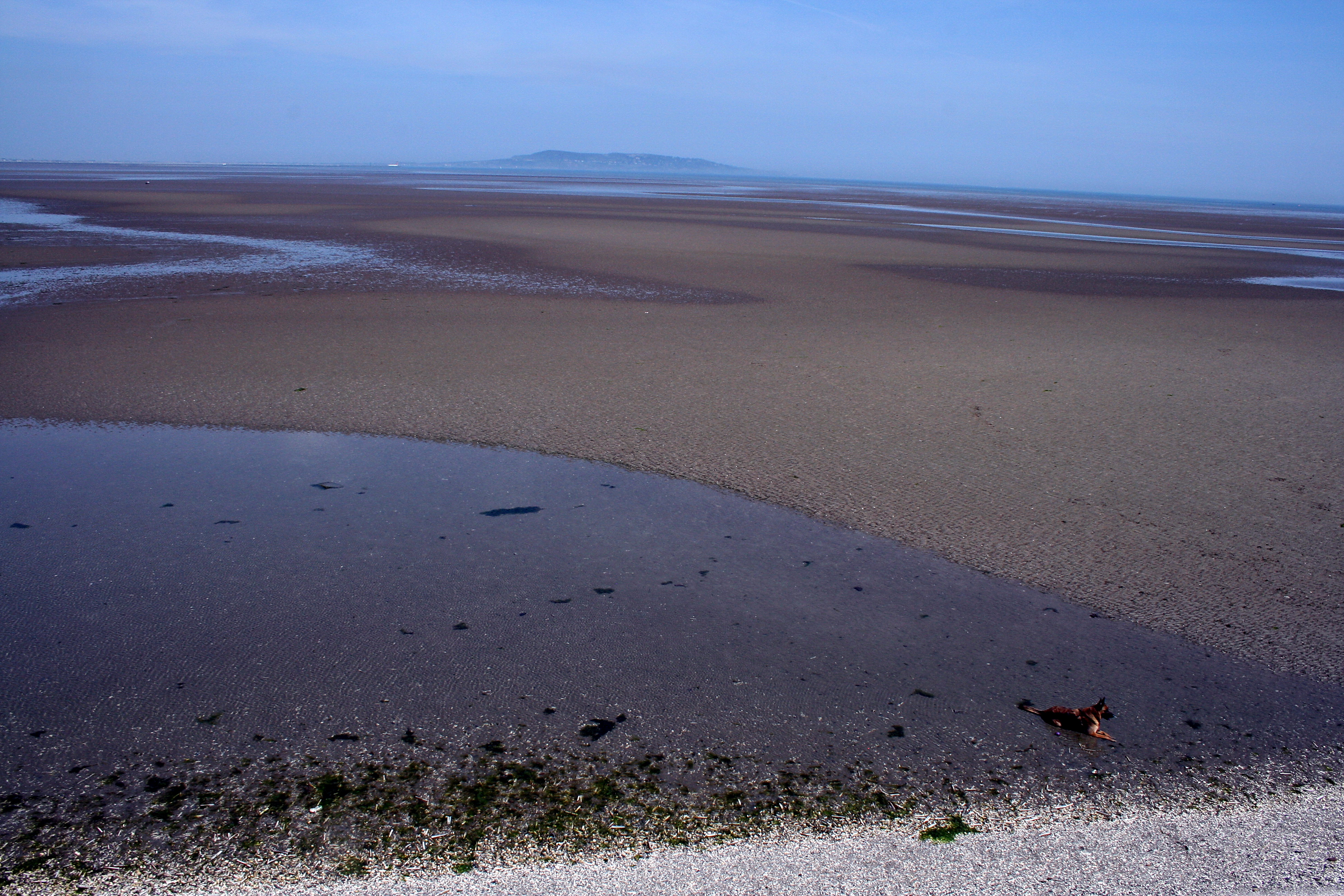
Dublin Bay

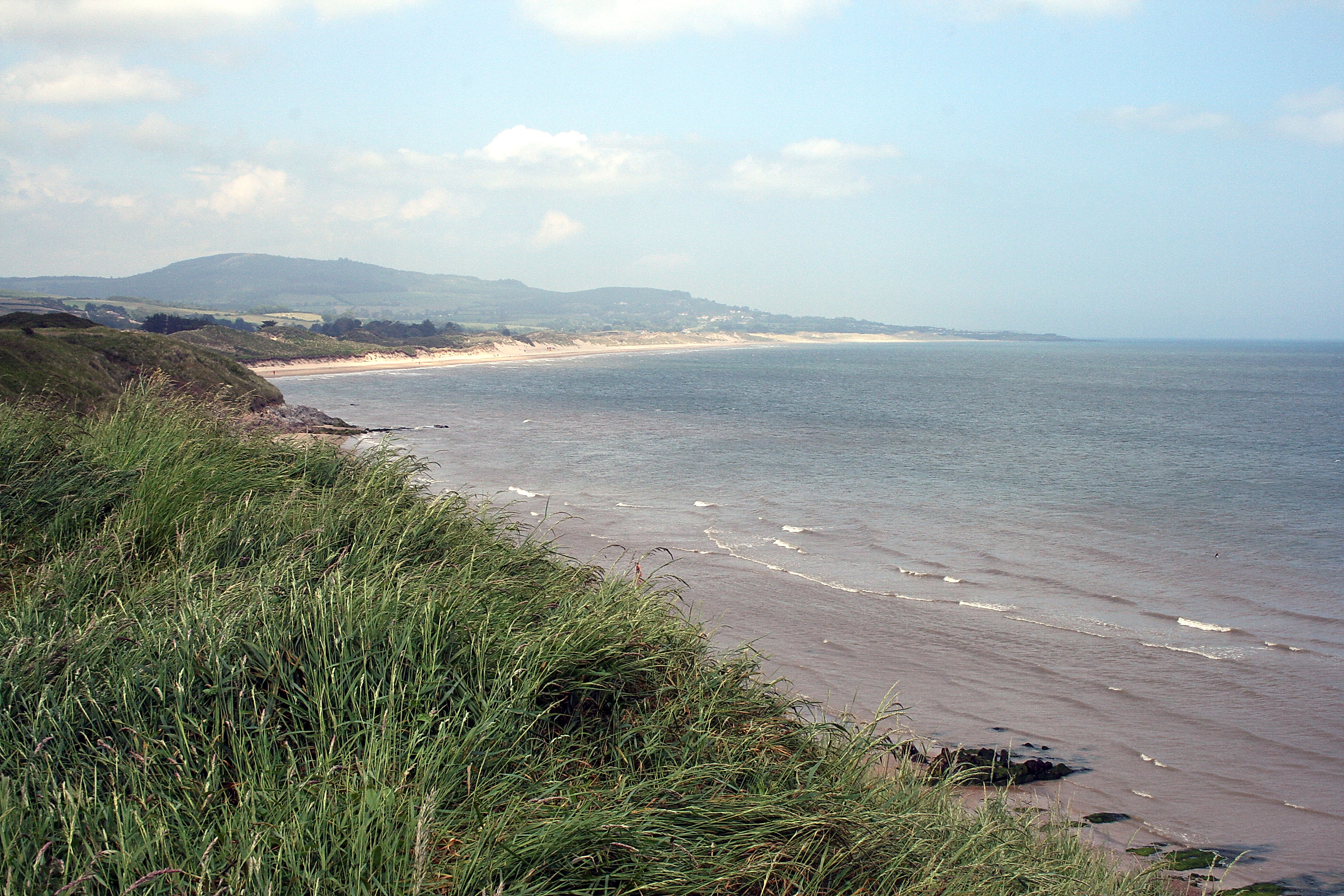
Brittas Bay

The Irish Sea (Note: Irish: Muir Éireann [mˠɪɾʲ ˈeːɾʲən̪ˠ] or An Mhuir Mheann [ənˠ wɪrʲ vʲan̪ˠ], Manx: Y Keayn Yernagh, Scots: Erse Sie, Scottish Gaelic: Muir Èireann [murʲ ˈeːrʲən̪ˠ], Ulster-Scots: Airish Sea, Welsh: Môr Iwerddon [moːr ɪuˈɛrðɔn].) is a 46,007 km^{2} (17,763 sq mi) body of water that separates the islands of Ireland, Isle of Man and Great Britain. It is linked to the Celtic Sea in the south by St George's Channel and to the Inner Seas off the West Coast of Scotland in the north by the North Channel. Anglesey, North Wales, is the largest island in the Irish Sea, followed by the Isle of Man. The term Manx Sea may occasionally be encountered (Welsh: Môr Manaw, Irish: Muir Meann Manx: Mooir Vannin, Scottish Gaelic: Muir Mhanainn).

On its shoreline are Scotland to the north, England to the east, Wales to the southeast, Northern Ireland and the Republic of Ireland to the west. The Irish Sea is of significant economic importance to regional trade, shipping and transport, as well as fishing and power generation in the form of wind power and nuclear power plants. Annual traffic between Great Britain and Ireland is over 12 million passengers and 17 million tonnes (17,000,000 long tons; 19,000,000 short tons) of traded goods.

== Topography ==
The Irish Sea joins the North Atlantic at both its northern and southern ends. To the north, the connection is through the North Channel between Scotland and Northern Ireland and the Malin Sea. The southern end is linked to the Atlantic through the St George's Channel between Ireland and Pembrokeshire, and the Celtic Sea. It is composed of a deeper channel about 300 km (190 mi) long and 30–50 km (20–30 mi) wide on its western side and shallower bays to the east. The depth of the western channel ranges from 80 m (260 ft) to 275 m (900 ft).

Cardigan Bay in the south, and the waters to the east of the Isle of Man, are less than 50 m (160 ft) deep. With a total water volume of 2,430 km^{3} (580 cu mi) and a surface area of 47,000 km^{2} (18,000 sq mi), 80% is to the west of the Isle of Man. The largest sandbanks are the Bahama and King William Banks to the east and north of the Isle of Man and the Kish Bank, Codling Bank, Arklow Bank and Blackwater Bank near the coast of Ireland. The Irish Sea, at its greatest width, is 200 km (120 mi) and narrows to 75 km (47 mi).

The International Hydrographic Organization defines the limits of the Irish Sea (with St George's Channel) as follows,

On the North. The Southern limit of the Inner Seas off the West Coast of Scotland, defined as a line joining the South extreme of the Mull of Galloway (54°38'N) in Scotland and Ballyquintin Point (54°20'N) in Northern Ireland.
On the South. A line joining St. David's Head in Wales (51°54′N 5°19′W) to Carnsore Point in Ireland (52°10′N 6°22′W).

The Irish Sea has undergone a series of dramatic changes over the last 20,000 years as the last glacial period ended and was replaced by warmer conditions. At the height of the glaciation, the central part of the modern sea was probably a long freshwater lake. As the ice retreated 10,000 years ago, the lake reconnected to the sea.

== History ==
The Irish Sea was formed in the Neogene era. The Irish Sea was called Mare Hibernicus in the Roman Empire. Notable crossings include several invasions from Britain. The Norman invasion of Ireland took place in stages during the late 12th century from Porthclais near St. Davids, Wales, in Hulks, Snekkars, Keels and Cogs to Wexford Harbour, Leinster. The Tudors crossed the Irish Sea to invade in 1529 in caravels and carracks.

== Shipping ==
Because Ireland has neither tunnel nor bridge to connect it with Great Britain, the vast majority of heavy goods trade is done by sea. Northern Ireland ports handle 10 million tonnes (9,800,000 long tons; 11,000,000 short tons) of goods trade with the rest of the United Kingdom annually; the ports in the Republic of Ireland handle 7.6 million tonnes (7,500,000 long tons; 8,400,000 short tons), representing 50% and 40% respectively of total trade by weight.

The Port of Liverpool handles 32 million tonnes (31,000,000 long tons; 35,000,000 short tons) of cargo and 734,000 passengers a year. Holyhead port handles most of the passenger traffic from Dublin and Dún Laoghaire ports, as well as 3.3 million tonnes (3,200,000 long tons; 3,600,000 short tons) of freight.

Ports in the Republic handle 3,600,000 travellers crossing the sea each year, amounting to 92% of all Irish Sea travel.

Ferry connections from Wales to Ireland across the Irish Sea include Fishguard Harbour and Pembroke to Rosslare, Holyhead to Dún Laoghaire and Holyhead to Dublin. From Scotland, Cairnryan connects with both Belfast and Larne. There is also a connection between Liverpool and Belfast via the Isle of Man or direct from Birkenhead. The world's largest car ferry, Ulysses, is operated by Irish Ferries on the Dublin Port–Holyhead route; Stena Line also operates between Britain and Ireland.

"Irish Sea" is also the name of one of the BBC's Shipping Forecast areas defined by the coordinates:

- 54°50′N 05°05′W
- 54°45′N 05°45′W
- 52°30′N 06°15′W
- 52°00′N 05°05′W

Iarnród Éireann, Irish Ferries, Northern Ireland Railways, ScotRail, Stena Line and Transport for Wales Rail promote SailRail with through rail tickets for the train and the ferry.

The British ship LCT 326 sank in the Irish sea and was discovered in March 2020. In September 2021, the British Navy ship HMS Mercury was discovered; it sank in 1940. The British ship SS Mesaba was sunk by the Imperial German Navy U-118 in 1918 and discovered in 2022. This ship is well known for sailing near the Titanic and for attempting to warn the Titanic about dangerous icebergs.

== Oil and gas exploration ==
=== Caernarfon Bay Basin ===
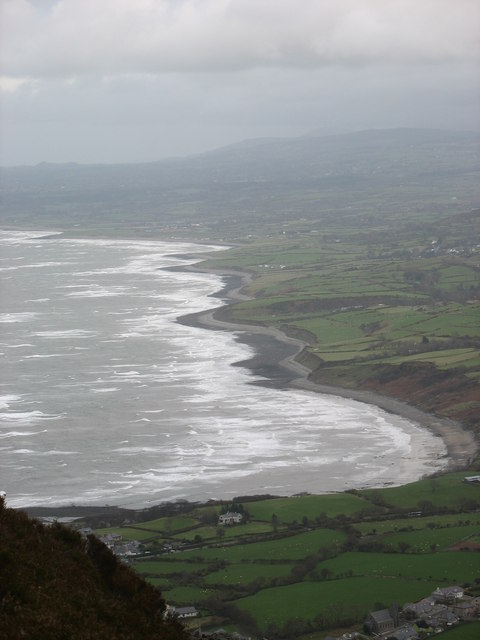
Caernarfon Bay

The Caernarfon Bay basin contains up to 7 cubic kilometres (1.7 cu mi) of Permian and Triassic syn-rift sediments in an asymmetrical graben that is bounded to the north and south by Lower Paleozoic massifs. Only two exploration wells have been drilled so far, and there remain numerous undrilled targets in tilted fault block plays. As in the East Irish Sea Basin, the principal target reservoir is the Lower Triassic Sherwood Sandstone, top-sealed by younger Triassic mudstone and evaporites. Wells in the Irish Sector to the west have demonstrated that pre-rift Westphalian coal measures are excellent hydrocarbon source rocks and are at peak maturity for gas generation (Maddox et al., 1995). Seismic profiles clearly image these strata continuing beneath a basal Permian unconformity into at least the western part of the Caernarfon Bay Basin.

The timing of gas generation presents the greatest exploration risk. Maximum burial of, and primary gas migration from, the source rocks could have terminated as early as the Jurassic, whereas many of the tilted fault blocks were reactivated or created during Paleogene inversion of the basin. However, it is also possible that a secondary gas charge occurred during regional heating associated with intrusion of Paleogene dykes, such as those that crop out nearby on the coastline of north Wales. Floodpage et al. (1999) have invoked this second phase of Paleogene hydrocarbon generation as an important factor in the charging of the East Irish Sea Basin's oil and gas fields. It is not clear as yet whether aeromagnetic anomalies in the southeast of Caernarfon Bay are imaging a continuation of the dyke swarm into this area too, or whether they are instead associated with deeply buried Permian syn-rift volcanics. Alternatively, the fault block traps could have been recharged by exsolution of methane from formation brines as a direct result of the Tertiary uplift (cf. Doré and Jensen, 1996).

=== Cardigan Bay Basin ===
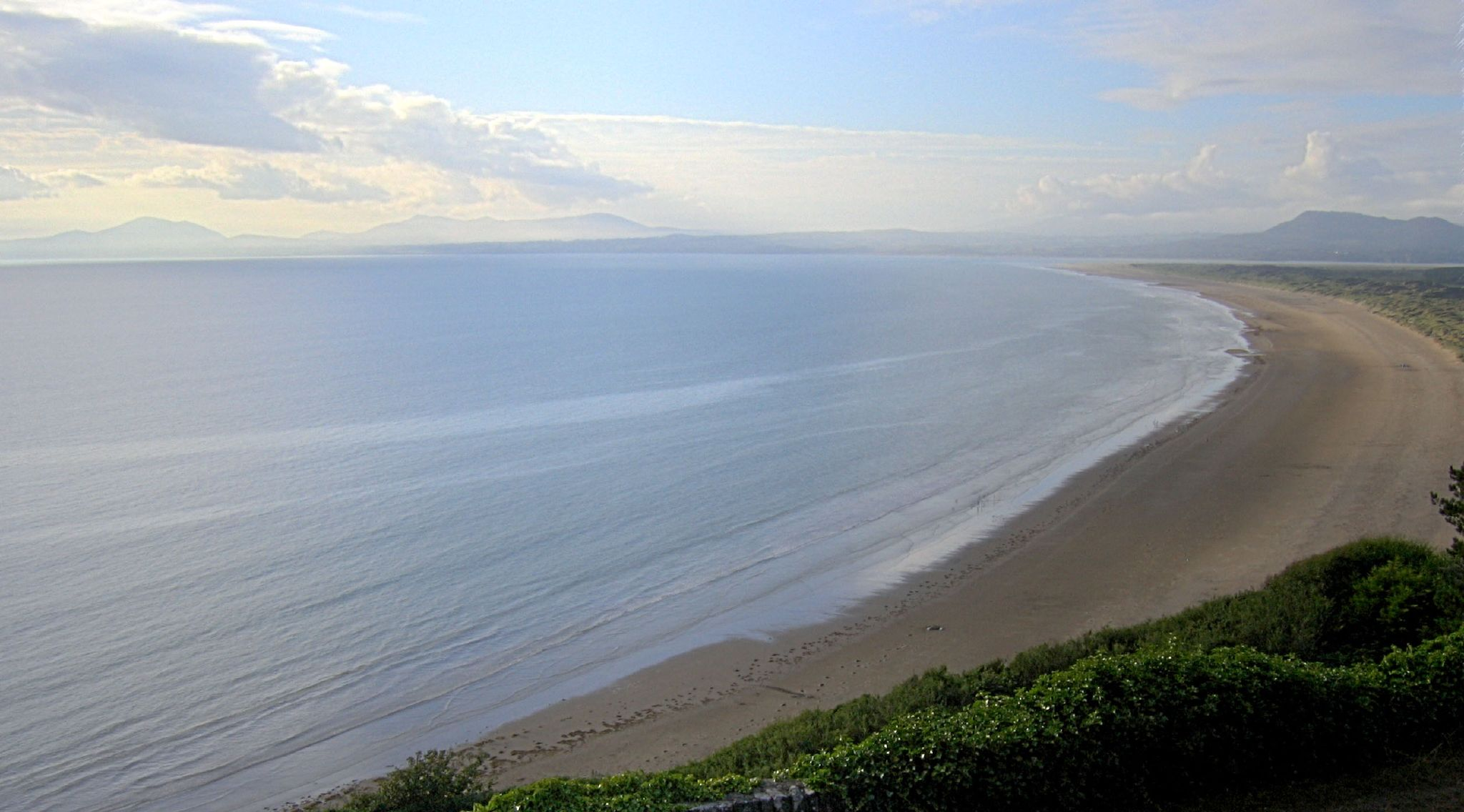
Cardigan Bay

The Cardigan Bay Basin forms a continuation into British waters of Ireland's North Celtic Sea Basin, which has two producing gas fields. The basin comprises a south-easterly deepening half-graben near the Welsh coastline, although its internal structure becomes increasingly complex towards the southwest. Permian to Triassic syn-rift sediments are less than 3 km thick and overlain by up to 4 km of Jurassic strata, and locally up to 2 km of Paleogene fluvio-deltaic sediments. The basin has a proven petroleum system, with potentially producible gas at the Dragon discovery and oil shows in three other wells. Reservoir targets include Lower Triassic Sherwood Sandstone, Middle Jurassic shallow marine sandstones and limestones (Great Oolite), and Upper Jurassic fluvial sandstone (Dragon Field reservoir).

The most likely hydrocarbon source rocks are Early Jurassic marine mudstones. These are fully mature for oil in the west of the UK sector and gas-mature in the adjacent Irish sector. Gas-prone Westphalian pre-rift coal measures may also exist locally at depth. The basin underwent two phases of Tertiary compressive uplift; maximum burial ended by the Late Cretaceous, or earlier if Cretaceous strata were never deposited. The Dragon discovery proves hydrocarbons were locally retained despite Tertiary deformation. Untested stratigraphic trap potential also exists near synsedimentary faults in the Middle Jurassic interval.

=== Liverpool Bay ===
The Liverpool Bay Development was BHP's largest operated asset. It comprises the integrated development of five offshore oil and gas fields in the Irish Sea:

Douglas oil field Hamilton gas field Hamilton North gas field Hamilton East gas field Lennox oil and gas field

Oil is produced from the Lennox and Douglas fields. It is then treated at the Douglas Complex and piped 17 km to an oil storage barge. Gas is produced from the Hamilton, Hamilton North and Hamilton East reservoirs. After initial processing at the Douglas Complex the gas is piped to the Point of Ayr terminal. It is then piped to PowerGen's CCGT station at Connah's Quay. PowerGen is the sole purchaser of gas from Liverpool Bay.

The Liverpool Bay Development comprises four offshore platforms, offshore storage and loading facilities, and the Point of Ayr terminal. Production started as follows: Hamilton North (1995), Hamilton (1996), Douglas (1996), Lennox (oil only, 1996), Hamilton East (2001). First contract gas sales were in 1996.

The quality of water in Liverpool Bay was historically affected by sewage sludge dumping, which became illegal in December 1988.

=== East Irish Sea Basin ===
With 210 billion cubic metres (7.5 trillion cubic feet) of gas and 176 million barrels (28,000,000 m^{3}) of oil estimated by operators (DTI, 2001), the basin is in a mature exploration phase. Early Namurian basinal mudstones are the source rocks. Production is from fault-bounded Lower Triassic Sherwood Sandstone reservoirs, sealed by Triassic mudstones and evaporites. Future exploration focuses on extending this play, with additional potential in Carboniferous fluvial sandstones. This requires intraformational mudstone seals because no top-seal exists where reservoirs subcrop the base Permian unconformity in the east; Carboniferous strata crop out at the seabed in the west.

=== Dalkey Island exploration prospect ===
Previous drilling in the Kish Bank Basin confirmed petroleum potential with oil shows in wells and hydrocarbon seeps from airborne surveys. New 2-D seismic analysis revealed a large undrilled Lower Triassic structural closure ~10 kilometres (6 mi) offshore Dublin. The Dalkey prospect may be oil-prone, given prolific Lower Triassic reservoirs in the nearby eastern Irish Sea. It may contain ~870 million barrels (140,000,000 m^{3}) of oil in place. The prospect carries significant risk; partners are advancing a focused work programme to mitigate these risks. Its shallow-water location near shore may reduce drilling and development costs.

== Cities and towns ==
Below is a list of cities and towns around the Irish Sea coasts in order of size:

Cities and towns on the Irish Sea coast

Rank	City/town	County	Region/Province/Sheading	Population	Country
1	Dublin	County Dublin	Leinster	1,458,154	Republic of Ireland
2	Liverpool	Merseyside	North West	498,042	England
3	Belfast	County Antrim	Ulster	343,542	Northern Ireland
4	Blackpool	Lancashire	North West	139,720	England
5	Southport	Merseyside	North West	91,703	England
6	Birkenhead	Merseyside	North West	88,818	England
7	Bangor	County Down	Ulster	64,596	Northern Ireland
8	Wallasey	Merseyside	North West	60,264	England
9	Barrow-in-Furness	Cumbria	North West	56,745	England
10	Morecambe	Lancashire	North West	55,589	England
11	Drogheda	County Louth	Leinster	44,135	Republic of Ireland
12	Dundalk	County Louth	Leinster	43,112	Republic of Ireland
13	Lytham St Annes	Lancashire	North West	42,954	England
14	Crosby	Merseyside	North West	41,789	England
15	Bray	County Wicklow	Leinster	33,512	Republic of Ireland
16	Colwyn Bay	Conwy	Clwyd	31,353	Wales
17	Thornton-Cleveleys	Lancashire	North West	31,157	England
18	Carrickfergus	County Antrim	Ulster	28,141	Northern Ireland
19	Douglas	Douglas	Middle	27,938	Isle of Man
20	Dún Laoghaire	Dún Laoghaire–Rathdown	Leinster	26,525	Republic of Ireland
21	Fleetwood	Lancashire	North West	25,939	England
22	Workington	Cumbria	North West	25,207	England
23	Rhyl	Denbighshire	Clwyd	25,149	Wales
24	Whitehaven	Cumbria	North West	23,986	England
25	Wexford	County Wexford	Leinster	21,524	Republic of Ireland
26	Llandudno	Conwy	Clwyd	20,701	Wales
27	Larne	County Antrim	Ulster	18,853	Northern Ireland
28	Holyhead	Isle of Anglesey	Gwynedd	13,659	Wales
29	Arklow	County Wicklow	Leinster	13,299	Republic of Ireland
30	Aberystwyth	Ceredigion	Dyfed	13,040	Wales

== Counties bordering the Irish Sea ==
County	Country
Isle of Man	Isle of Man
County Antrim	Northern Ireland
County Down	Northern Ireland
County Louth	Republic of Ireland
County Meath	Republic of Ireland
County Dublin	Republic of Ireland
County Wicklow	Republic of Ireland
County Wexford	Republic of Ireland
Pembrokeshire	Wales
Ceredigion	Wales
Gwynedd	Wales
Isle of Anglesey	Wales
Conwy	Wales
Denbighshire	Wales
Flintshire	Wales
Merseyside	England
Lancashire	England
Cumbria	England
Dumfries and Galloway	Scotland

== Islands ==
- Listed are the islands in the Irish Sea which are either at least one square kilometre in area, or which have a permanent population.
- Anglesey and Holy Island are included separately.

Name	Area (km^{2})	Rank (area)	Permanent Population	Rank (pop.)	Country
Anglesey	675	1	56,092	2	Wales
Isle of Man	572	2	84,497	1	Isle of Man
Holy Island	39	3	13,579	3	Wales
Walney Island	13	4	11,388	4	England
Lambay Island	5.54	5	<10	8	Republic of Ireland
Bull Island	3	6	<20	7	Republic of Ireland
Ramsey Island	2.58	7	0	-	Wales
Bardsey Island	1.79	9	<5	10	Wales
Calf of Man	2.50	8	0	-	Isle of Man
Barrow Island	1.50	-	2,616	5	England
Roa Island	0.03	-	100	6	England
Ynys Gaint	0.04	-	<10	8	Wales
Piel Island	0.20	-	<5	10	England
Ynys Castell	0.006	-	<5	10	Wales
Ynys Gored Goch	0.004	-	<5	10	Wales

== Environment ==
The most accessible and possibly the greatest wildlife resource of the Irish Sea lies in its estuaries: particularly the Dee Estuary, the Mersey Estuary, the Ribble Estuary, Morecambe Bay, the Solway Firth, the Firth of Clyde, Belfast Lough, Strangford Lough, Carlingford Lough, Dundalk Bay, Dublin Bay and Wexford Harbour. However, a lot of wildlife also depends on the cliffs, salt marshes and sand dunes of the adjoining shores, the seabed and the open sea itself.

The information on the invertebrates of the seabed of the Irish Sea is rather patchy because it is difficult to survey such a large area, where underwater visibility is often poor and information often depends upon looking at material brought up from the seabed in mechanical grabs. However, the groupings of animals present depend to a large extent on whether the seabed is composed of rock, boulders, gravel, sand, mud or even peat. In the soft sediments seven types of community have been provisionally identified, variously dominated by brittle-stars, sea urchins, worms, mussels, tellins, furrow-shells, and tower-shells.

Parts of the bed of the Irish Sea are very rich in wildlife. The seabed southwest of the Isle of Man is particularly noted for its rarities and diversity, as are the horse mussel beds of Strangford Lough. Scallops and queen scallops are found in more gravelly areas. In the estuaries, where the bed is more sandy or muddy, the number of species is smaller but the size of their populations is larger. Brown shrimp, cockles and edible mussels support local fisheries in Morecambe Bay and the Dee Estuary and the estuaries are also important as nurseries for flatfish, herring and sea bass. Muddy seabeds in deeper waters are home to populations of the Dublin Bay prawn, also known as "scampi".

The open sea is a complex habitat in its own right. It exists in three spatial dimensions and also varies over time and tide. For example, where freshwater flows into the Irish Sea in river estuaries its influence can extend far offshore as the freshwater is lighter and "floats" on top of the much larger body of salt water until wind and temperature changes mix it in. Similarly, warmer water is less dense and seawater warmed in the inter-tidal zone may "float" on the colder offshore water. The amount of light penetrating the seawater also varies with depth and turbidity. This leads to differing populations of plankton in different parts of the sea and varying communities of animals that feed on these populations. However, increasing seasonal storminess leads to greater mixing of water and tends to break down these divisions, which are more apparent when the weather is calm for long periods.

Plankton includes bacteria, plants (phytoplankton) and animals (zooplankton) that drift in the sea. Most are microscopic, but some, such as the various species of jellyfish and sea gooseberry, can be much bigger.

Diatoms and dinoflagellates dominate the phytoplankton. Although they are microscopic plants, diatoms have hard shells and dinoflagellates have little tails that propel them through the water. Phytoplankton populations in the Irish Sea have a spring "bloom" every April and May, when the seawater is generally at its greenest.

Crustaceans, especially copepods, dominate the zooplankton. However, many animals of the seabed, the open sea and the seashore spend their juvenile stages as part of the zooplankton. The whole plankton "soup" is vitally important, directly or indirectly, as a food source for most species in the Irish Sea, even the largest. The enormous basking shark, for example, lives entirely on plankton and the leatherback turtle's main food is jellyfish.

A colossal diversity of invertebrate species live in the Irish Sea and its surrounding coastline, ranging from flower-like fan-worms to predatory swimming crabs to large chameleon-like cuttlefish. Some of the most significant for other wildlife are the reef-building species like the inshore horse mussel of Strangford Lough, the inter-tidal honeycomb worm of Morecambe Bay, Cumbria and Lancashire, and the sub-tidal honeycomb worm of the Wicklow Reef. These build up large structures over many years and, in turn, provide surfaces, nooks and crannies where other marine animals and plants may become established and live out some or all of their lives.

There are quite regular records of live and stranded leatherback turtles in and around the Irish Sea. This species travels north to the waters off the British Isles every year following the swarms of jellyfish that form its prey. Loggerhead turtle, ridley sea turtle and green turtle are found very occasionally in the Irish Sea but are generally unwell or dead when discovered. They have strayed or been swept out of their natural range further south into colder waters.

The estuaries of the Irish Sea are of international importance for birds. They are vital feeding grounds on migration flyways for shorebirds travelling between the Arctic and Africa. Others depend on the milder climate as a refuge when continental Europe is in the grip of winter.

Twenty-one species of seabird are reported as regularly nesting on beaches or cliffs around the Irish Sea. Huge populations of the sea duck, common scoter, spend winters feeding in shallow waters off eastern Ireland, Lancashire and North Wales.

Whales, dolphins and porpoises all frequent the Irish Sea, but knowledge of how many there may be and where they go is somewhat sketchy. About a dozen species have been recorded since 1980, but only three are seen fairly often. These are the harbour porpoise, bottlenose dolphin and common dolphin. The more rarely seen species are minke whale, fin whale, sei whale, humpback whale, North Atlantic right whales which are now considered to be almost extinct in eastern North Atlantic, sperm whale, northern bottlenose whale, long-finned pilot whale, orca, white-beaked dolphin, striped dolphin and Risso's dolphin. In 2005, a plan to reintroduce grey whales by airlifting 50 of them from the Pacific Ocean to the Irish Sea was claimed to be logically and ethically feasible; it has not been implemented as of 2013.

The common or harbour seal and the grey seal are both resident in the Irish Sea. Common seals breed in Strangford Lough, grey seals in southwest Wales and, in small numbers, on the Isle of Man. Grey seals haul out, but do not breed, off Hilbre and Walney islands, Merseyside, the Wirral, St Annes, Barrow-in-Furness Borough, and Cumbria.

== Radioactivity ==
The Irish Sea has been described by Greenpeace as the most radioactively contaminated sea in the world with some "eight million litres of nuclear waste" discharged into it each day from Sellafield reprocessing plants, contaminating seawater, sediments and marine life.

Low-level radioactive waste has been discharged into the Irish Sea as part of operations at Sellafield since 1952. The rate of discharge began to accelerate in the mid- to late 1960s, reaching a peak in the 1970s and generally declining significantly since then. As an example of this profile, discharges of plutonium (specifically ^{241}Pu) peaked in 1973 at 2,755 terabecquerels (74,500 Ci) falling to 8.1 TBq (220 Ci) by 2004. Improvements in the treatment of waste in 1985 and 1994 resulted in further reductions in radioactive waste discharge although the subsequent processing of a backlog resulted in increased discharges of certain types of radioactive waste. Discharges of technetium in particular rose from 6.1 TBq (160 Ci) in 1993 to a peak of 192 TBq (5,200 Ci) in 1995 before dropping back to 14 TBq (380 Ci) in 2004. In total 22 petabecquerels (590 kCi) of ^{241}Pu was discharged over the period 1952 to 1998. Current rates of discharge for many radionuclides are at least 100 times lower than they were in the 1970s.

Analysis of the distribution of radioactive contamination after discharge reveals that mean sea currents result in much of the more soluble elements such as caesium being flushed out of the Irish Sea through the North Channel about a year after discharge. Measurements of technetium concentrations post-1994 has produced estimated transit times to the North Channel of around six months with peak concentrations off the northeast Irish coast occurring 18–24 months after peak discharge. Less soluble elements such as plutonium are subject to much slower redistribution. Whilst concentrations have declined in line with the reduction in discharges they are markedly higher in the eastern Irish Sea compared to the western areas. The dispersal of these elements is closely associated with sediment activity, with muddy deposits on the seabed acting as sinks, soaking up an estimated 200 kg (440 lb) of plutonium. The highest concentration is found in the eastern Irish Sea in sediment banks lying parallel to the Cumbrian coast. This area acts as a significant source of wider contamination as radionuclides are dissolved once again. Studies have revealed that 80% of current seawater contamination by caesium is sourced from sediment banks, whilst plutonium levels in the western sediment banks between the Isle of Man and the Irish coast are being maintained by contamination redistributed from the eastern sediment banks.

The consumption of seafood harvested from the Irish Sea is the main pathway for exposure of humans to radioactivity. The environmental monitoring report for the period 2003 to 2005 published by the Radiological Protection Institute of Ireland (RPII) reported that in 2005 average quantities of radioactive contamination found in seafood ranged from less than 1 Bq/kg (12 pCi/lb) for fish to under 44 Bq/kg (540 pCi/lb) for mussels. Doses of man-made radioactivity received by the heaviest consumers of seafood in Ireland in 2005 was 1.10 μSv (0.000110 rem). This compares with a corresponding dosage of radioactivity naturally occurring in the seafood consumed by this group of 148 μSv (0.0148 rem) and a total average dosage in Ireland from all sources of 3,620 μSv (0.362 rem). In terms of risk to this group, heavy consumption of seafood generates a 1 in 18 million chance of causing cancer. The general risk of contracting cancer in Ireland is 1 in 522. In the UK, the heaviest seafood consumers in Cumbria received a radioactive dosage attributable to Sellafield discharges of 220 μSv (0.022 rem) in 2005. This compares to average annual dose of naturally sourced radiation received in the UK of 2,230 μSv (0.223 rem).

== Proposed fixed sea link connections ==
Discussions of linking Britain to Ireland began in 1895, with an application for £15,000 towards the cost of carrying out borings and soundings in the North Channel to see if a tunnel between Ireland and Scotland was viable. Sixty years later, Harford Montgomery Hyde, Unionist MP for North Belfast, called for the building of such a tunnel. A tunnel project has been discussed several times in the Irish parliament. The idea for a 34-kilometre (21 mi) long rail bridge or tunnel continues to be mooted. Several potential projects have been proposed, including one between Dublin and Holyhead put forward in 1997 by the British engineering firm Symonds. At 80 km (50 mi), it would have been by far the longest rail tunnel on earth with an estimated cost approaching £20 billion.

== Wind power ==
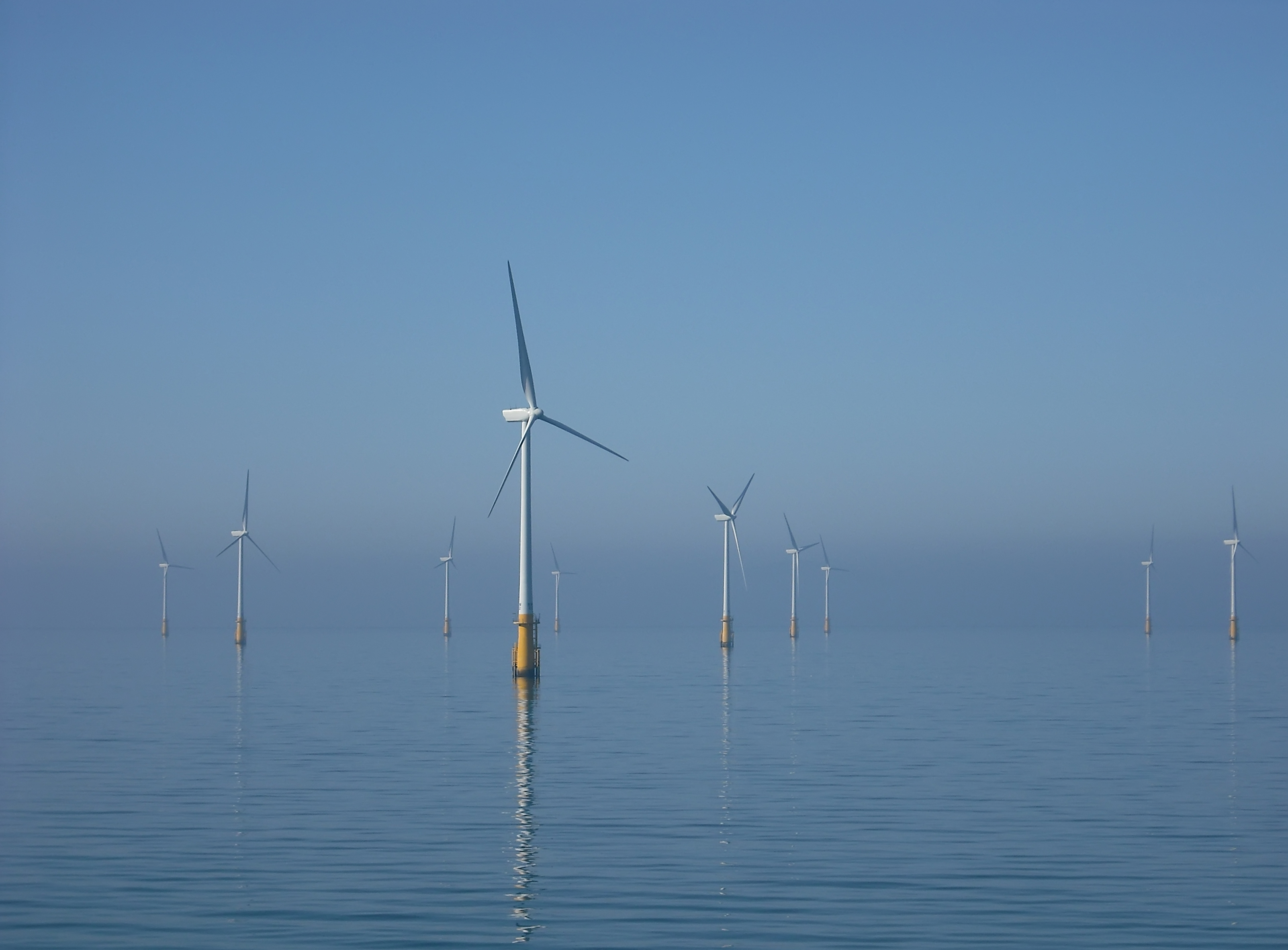
Barrow Offshore windfarm, off Walney Island

An offshore wind farm was developed on the Arklow Bank, Arklow Bank Wind Park, about 10 km (6.2 mi) off the coast of County Wicklow in the south Irish Sea. The site currently has seven GE 3.6 MW turbines, each with 104-metre (341 ft) diameter rotors, the world's first commercial application of offshore wind turbines over three megawatts in size. The operating company, Airtricity, has indefinite plans for nearly 100 further turbines on the site.

Further wind turbine sites include:

- The North Hoyle site 8 kilometres (5 mi) off the coast from Rhyl and Prestatyn in North Wales, containing thirty 2 MW turbines. operated by NPower Renewables
- Burbo Bank site 10 kilometres (6.2 mi) off the north Wirral coast
- Robin Rigg Wind Farm in the Solway Firth
- Thirty 90-metre (300 ft) 3 MW turbines are operating in a wind farm 7 km (4.3 mi) the coast of Walney Island.
- The Warmley Extension 14 kilometres (9 mi) west of Walney Island off the coast of Cumbria. As of 2018, it is the largest on Earth.

== In popular culture ==
- During World War I the Irish Sea became known as "U-boat Alley", because the U-boats moved their emphasis from the Atlantic to the Irish Sea after the United States entered the war in 1917.
- The Port of Barrow-in-Furness, one of Britain's largest shipbuilding centres and home to the United Kingdom's only submarine-building complex, is only a minor port.
- The Irish Sea figures prominently in the Mabinogion. In the second branch of the Mabinogi the Irish Sea is crossed from the south to Harlech by Matholwch, the Irish King, who has come to seek the hand of Branwen ferch Llŷr, sister of Bendigeidfran, King of the Island of the Mighty. Branwen and Matholwch marry, but when she becomes abused by Matholwch, her brother crosses the sea from Wales to Ireland to rescue her. Within the story the Irish Sea is said to be shallow; in addition, it contains two rivers, the Lli and the Archan.
- The fictional Sodor, an island in both Wilbert Awdry's The Railway Series and the children's TV show, Thomas and Friends based on Awdry's books, is located in the Irish Sea.

== See also ==
- List of crossings of the Irish Sea
- List of Irish Sea crossings by air
- North Channel bridge proposal
- Transport in Ireland
- Transport in the United Kingdom
- Transport on the Isle of Man
