= List of crossings of the Irish Sea =

The Irish Sea separates Great Britain and the island of Ireland. The sea has been a significant trade and communications barrier between the two islands for centuries as there is no fixed crossing across it. In 2013, 7.6 megatons of trade was handled between British and Irish ports, and ferry crossings remain the most important link for heavy goods vehicles. Ferry services have continued to be significant, and 3.6 million passengers use these annually.

The main operators across the Irish Sea are P&O Ferries, Irish Ferries, Stena Line and the Isle of Man Steam Packet Company.

== Current ==
Image	East side	West side	Operator	Year opened	Year closed	Notes
	Ardrossan	Larne	P&O Irish Sea (until 2001)		2001	Moved to Troon
	Troon	Larne	P&O Ferries (2001-2016); Seacat Scotland (1999-2004)	1999	2016	
	Cairnryan	Belfast	Stena Line	2011		
	Cairnryan	Larne	P&O Ferries	1973		
	Stranraer	Belfast	Stena Line (1995-2011); Seacat Scotland (1992-2000)	1992	2011	
	Stranraer	Larne	Stena Line	1861	1995	
	Heysham	Belfast	Stena Line			
	Heysham	Warrenpoint	Seatruck Ferries	1996		
	Heysham	Dublin	Seatruck Ferries			
	Liverpool	Dublin	P&O Ferries; Seatruck Ferries			
	Birkenhead	Belfast	Stena Line	2002		
	Mostyn	Dublin	P&O Irish Sea	2001	2004	
	Holyhead	Dublin	Irish Ferries; Stena Line (1995-present)	1848		
	Holyhead	Dún Laoghaire	Stena Line	1848	2014	
	Fishguard	Rosslare	Stena Line			
	Pembroke Dock	Rosslare	Irish Ferries			
	Liverpool Pier Head	Dublin/Belfast/Douglas	Isle of Man Steam Packet Company			

== See also ==
- Irish Sea fixed crossing
