= Sea of the Hebrides =

Part of the Atlantic, off western Scotland

- An Cuan Barrach (Scottish Gaelic)
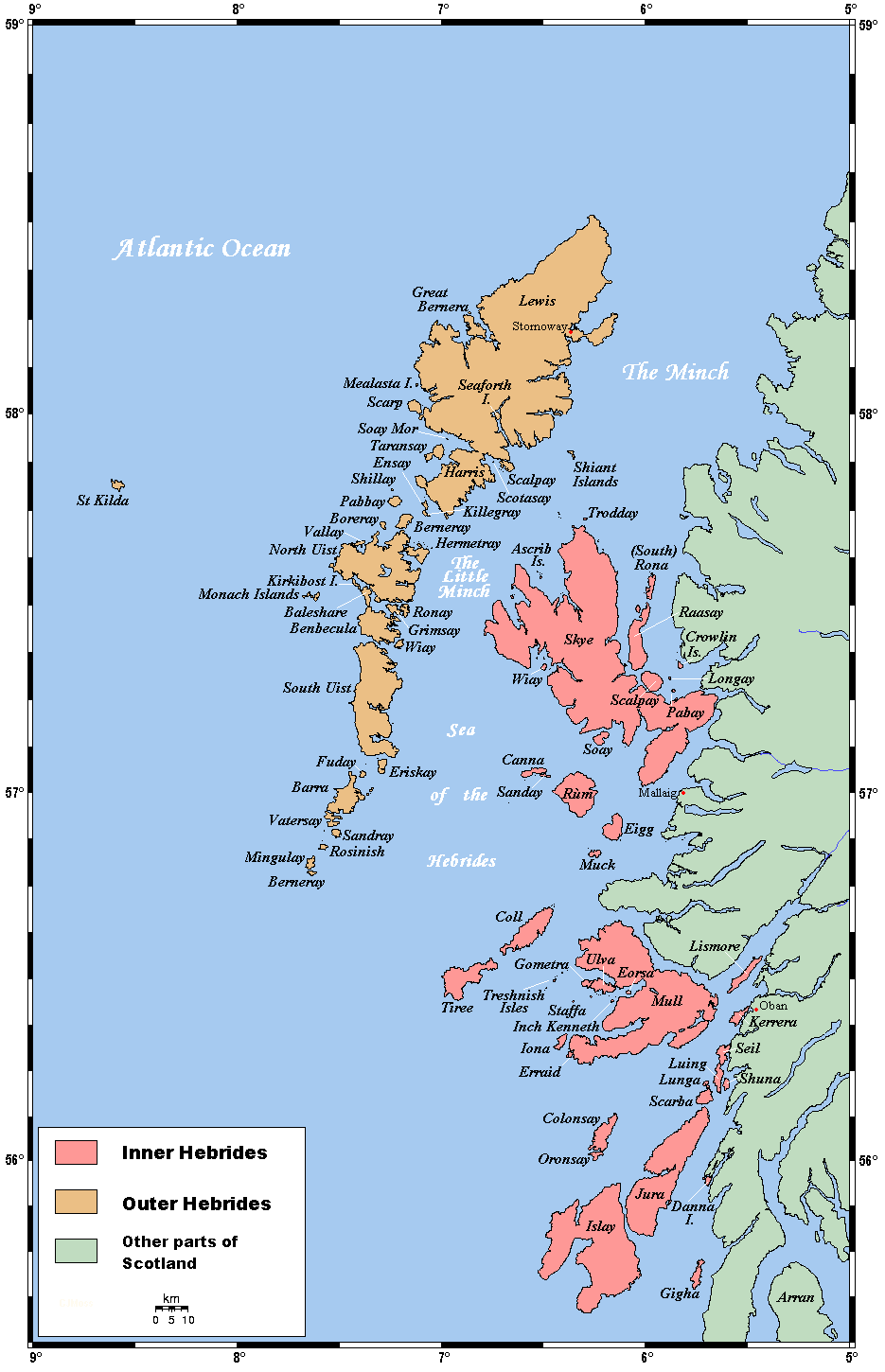
- The Inner Hebrides and Outer Hebrides

- Location within Scotland
- Location: Scotland
- Coordinates: 57°N 7°W
- Type: Sea

The Sea of the Hebrides (Scottish Gaelic: An Cuan Barrach, pronounced [ən̪ˠ ˈkʰuan ˈparˠəx]) is a small and partly sheltered section of the North Atlantic Ocean, indirectly off the southern part of the north-west coast of Scotland. To the east are the mainland of Scotland and the northern Inner Hebrides (including Skye and the Small Isles); to the west are the southern Outer Hebrides islands, principally South Uist, Eriskay, and Barra. To the north is the Little Minch, a channel connecting it with the Minch.

The Sea of the Hebrides forms part of the Inner Seas off the West Coast of Scotland, as defined by the International Hydrographic Organization, and part of the Seas west of Scotland as far as fisheries management is concerned.

Ending on 30 August 2019, the Scottish Government consulted on a proposal to designate the Sea of the Hebrides a Marine Protected Area (MPA). The designation was confirmed in December 2020. The designated area of the MPA covers 10,039 square kilometres (3,876 mi^{2}), mainly to protect the area's population of basking sharks and minke whales.
