= Fishing in the North Sea =

Sk=Skagerrak Ka=Kattegat
Eng Ch=English Channel

Fishing in the North Sea is concentrated in the southern part of the coastal waters. The main method of fishing is trawling.

Annual catches grew each year until the 1980s, when a high point of more than 3 million metric tons (3.3 million S/T) was reached. Since then, the numbers have fallen back to around 2.3 million tons (2.5 million S/T) annually with considerable differences between years. Besides the fish caught, it is estimated that 150,000 metric tons (165,000 S/T) of unmarketable by-catch are caught and around 85,000 metric tons (94,000 S/T) of dead and injured invertebrates.

Of the caught fish, about half are used for the production of fish oil and fish meal.

== History ==
Sturgeon, shad, rays, skates and salmon among other species were common in the North Sea into the 20th century, when numbers declined due to overfishing.

Other factors like the introduction of non-indigenous species, industrial and agricultural pollution, trawling and dredging, human-induced eutrophication, construction on coastal breeding and feeding grounds, sand and gravel extraction, offshore construction, and heavy shipping traffic have also contributed to the decline.

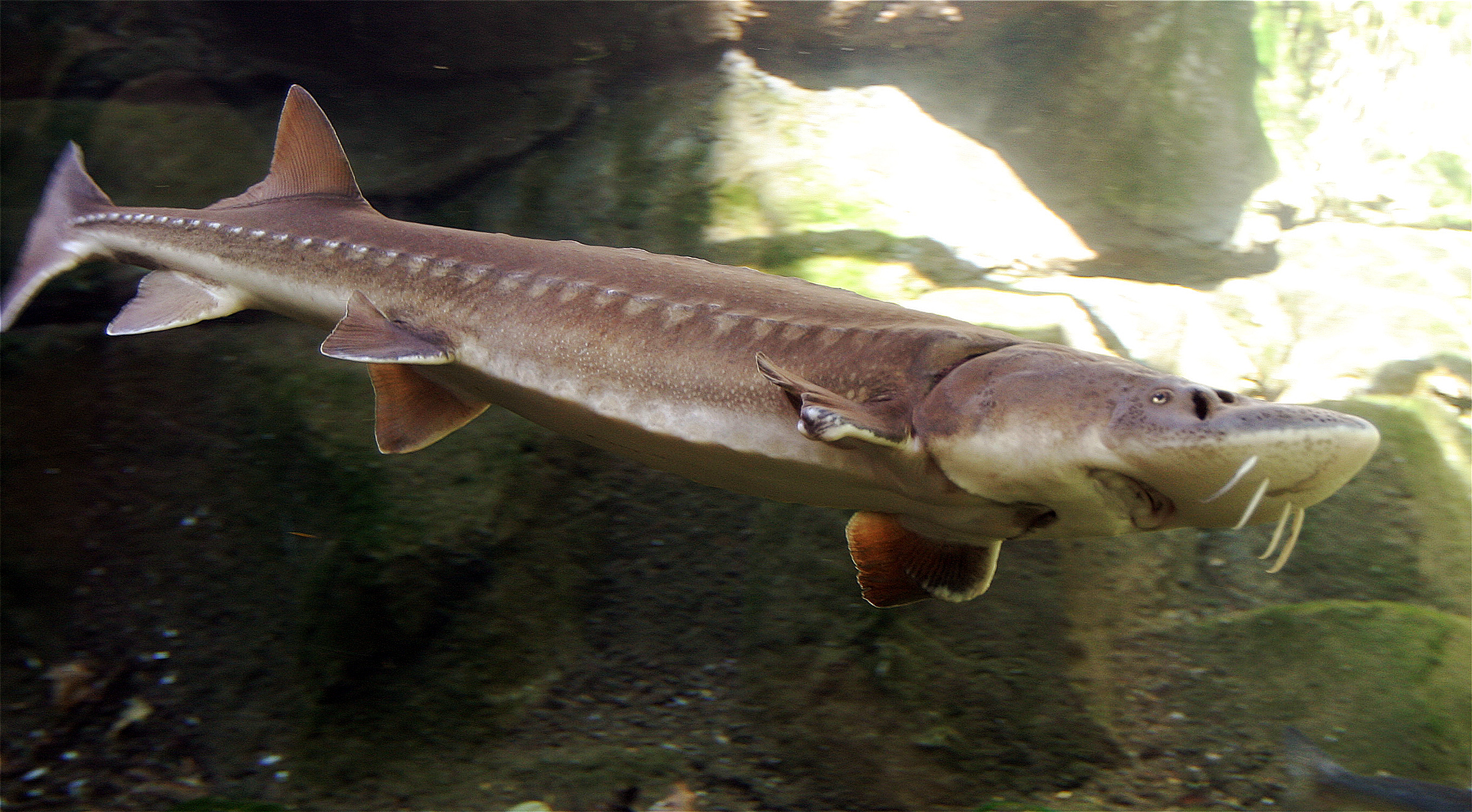
A sturgeon

Various agreements have been made in the course of history. A 15th-century document illustrates shared use, and the "London convention on fisheries" was signed in 1964.

The OSPAR commission manages the OSPAR convention to counteract the harmful effects of human activity on wildlife in the North Sea, preserve endangered species, and provide environmental protection. All North Sea border states are signatories of the MARPOL 73/78 Accords which preserves the marine environment by preventing pollution from ships. Germany, Denmark, and the Netherlands also have a trilateral agreement for the protection of the Wadden Sea, or mudflats, which run along the coasts of the three countries on the southern edge of the North Sea.

At the end of the 19th century large quantities of herring were produced in Scotland. Today mainly mackerel, Atlantic cod, whiting, coalfish, European plaice, and sole are caught. In addition, common shrimp, lobster, and crab, along with a variety of shellfish are harvested.

== Overfishing ==
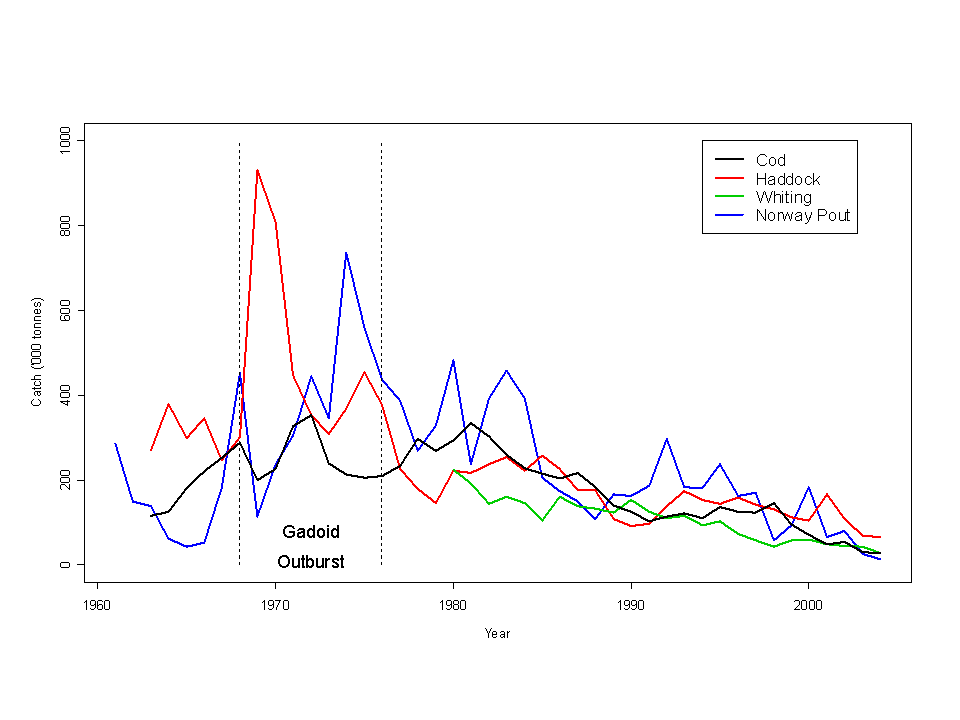
Trends in landings of Cod, Haddock, Whiting and Norway Pout from the North Sea (1961–2004)

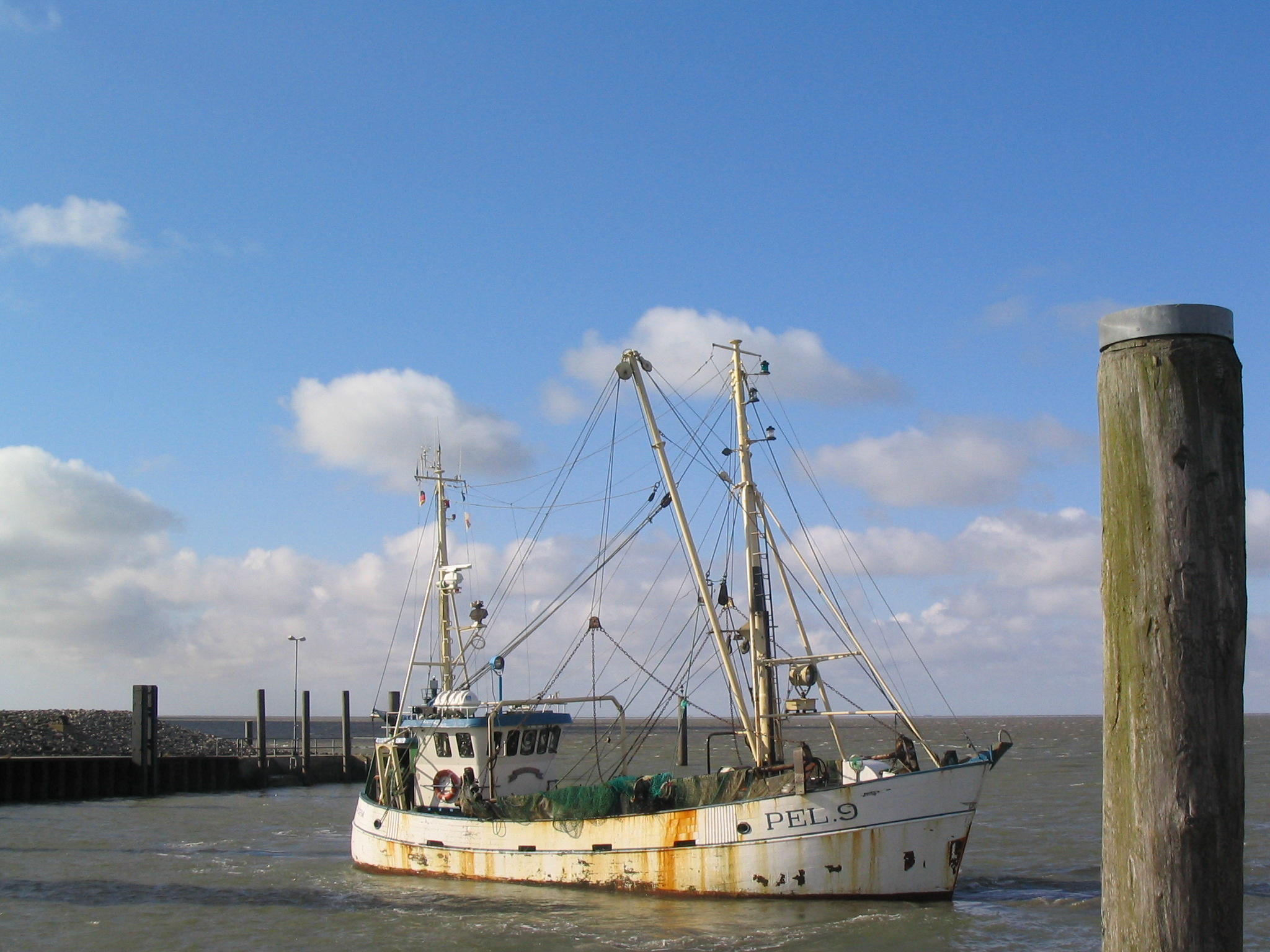
A trawler in Nordstrand, Germany

In recent decades, overfishing has left many fisheries unproductive, disturbing the marine food chain dynamics and costing jobs in the fishing industry. Herring, cod and plaice fisheries may soon face the same plight as mackerel fishing which ceased in the 1970s due to overfishing. Since the 1960s, various regulations have attempted to protect the stocks of fish such as limited fishing times and limited numbers of fishing boats, among other regulations. However, these rules were never systematically enforced and did not bring much relief. Since then, the United Kingdom and Denmark, two important fishing nations, became members of the EU, and have attempted, with the help of the Common Fisheries Policy, to bring the problem under control. Countries in the EU also have their own policies and laws in an attempt to address the problem of overfishing. The differing policies between countries have been blamed as the cause of tension between fishers, such as the 2012 English Channel scallop fishing dispute.

Norway, not a member of the EU, has also reached an agreement with the European Community concerning fishing policy. Regional advisory committees meet with the EU to help enforce policy.

In addition to threats due to food-chain disturbances, non-target species often wind up as victims of intense fishing. Sea turtles, dolphins, harbour porpoises, rays, and dozens of fish species are killed or injured by trawlers nets and beams. Trawling can also have a destructive effect on seabed habitats as the trawler beams drag along the floor can uproot plants and destroy reefs.

Fish caught in the North Sea in metric tons
Country/Year	1950	1960	1970	1980	1990	1996	2002
Belgium	28,036	30,094	26,547	32,065	26,889	18,880	14,657
Denmark	96,494	284,527	528,127	1,806,191	1,328,251	1,284,365	1,249,656
France	79,751	149,769	202,948	100,861	64,860	35,262	55,379
Faroe Islands	38,630	17,111	63,725	71,540	23,292	27,572	0
Germany	233,481	305,776	284,685	90,217	108,990	63,647	69,836
Iceland	0	50,065	21,111	523	0	8	4,668
Netherlands	64,438	92,119	121,524	213,365	256,597	140,765	146,835
Norway	296,337	323,381	480,819	498,777	617,741	618,669	691,062
Soviet Union (later Russia)	89,269	352,857	429,182	7,181	1	0	0
Sweden	43,680	71,899	124,790	86,465	116,695	72,863	131,991
United Kingdom	308,895	343,002	410,775	389,417	343,205	355,385	295,367
Total	1,286,230	2,120,137	2,807,950	3,306,127	2,893,422	2,643,719	2,687,299
Source: All numbers from the FAO, cited by the University of British Columbia. For the FAO, the region "North Sea" includes Skagerrak and Kattegat

== Sources ==
- Ilyina, P Ilyina (2007) The fate of persistent organic pollutants in the North Sea. Springer. ISBN 978-3-540-68162-5)
- Karlsdóttir, Hrefna M (2005) Fishing on common grounds : the consequences of unregulated fisheries of North Sea herring in the postwar period. ISBN 91-85196-62-2)
