= SailRail =

Train and ferry ticket in Britain and Ireland

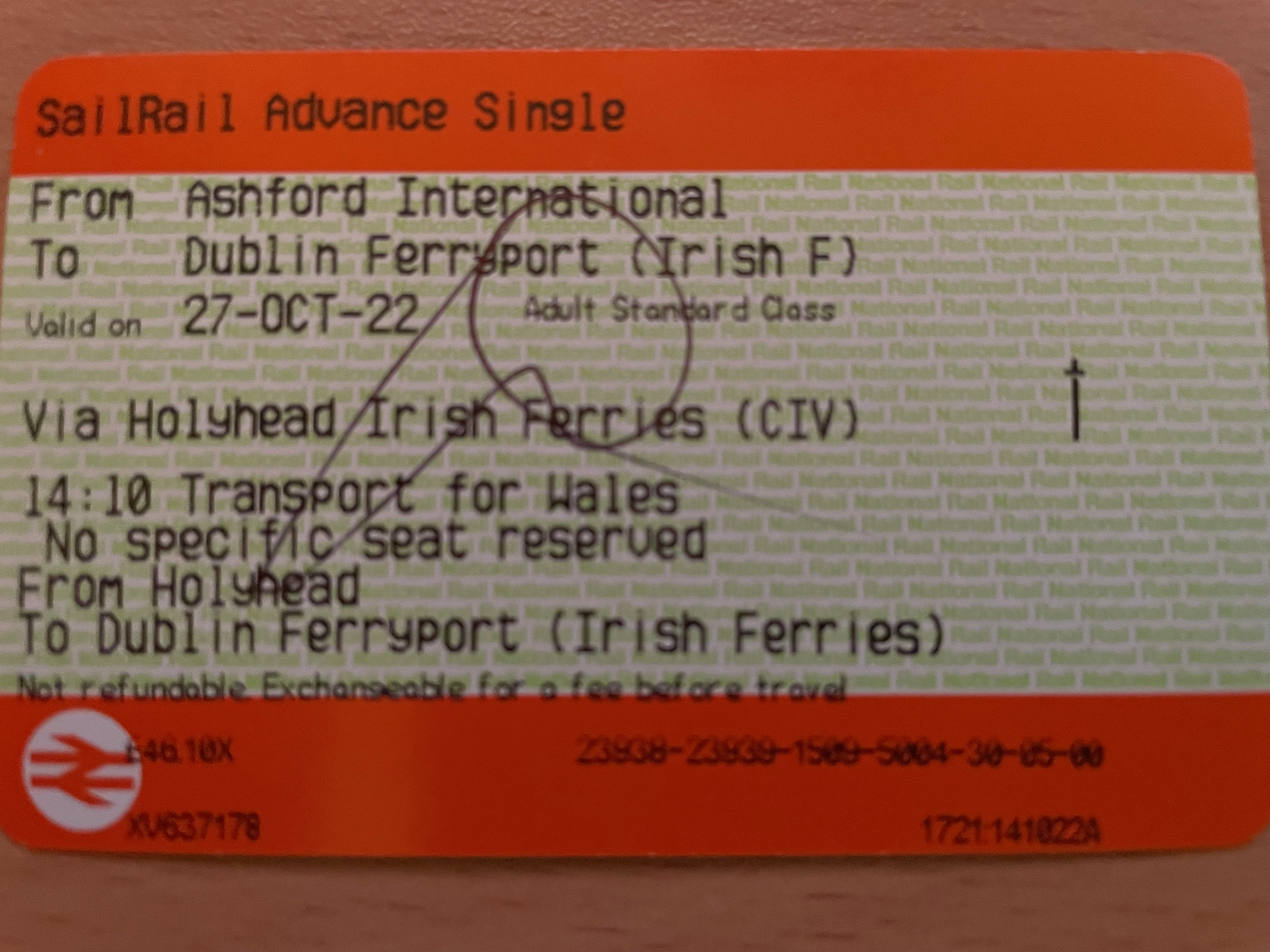
A SailRail ticket from Ashford International to Dublin Ferryport via Holyhead

In Britain and Ireland, a SailRail ticket allows travel with a combination of train and ferry. The brand, which was in existence by 2005, is principally associated with rail tickets between National Rail stations in Great Britain and stations in Ireland, including ferry travel on one of three routes across the Irish Sea.

== Britain and Ireland ==
In Britain and Ireland, a SailRail ticket (also known as Rail and Sail) can be purchased from any station in Great Britain to any station on the Island of Ireland, using a suitable ferry service, such as Holyhead to Dublin or Belfast to Cairnryan, with prices starting from £46.10. The ticket is a joint scheme between Rail Delivery Group (representing the mainland British train operating companies), Iarnród Éireann, Irish Ferries, Stena Line, and Northern Ireland Railways.

The fare for the ticket is fixed, and can still be affordable even if purchased on the day of travel, unlike most airline tickets.

SailRail competes against airlines linking city pairs across the Irish Sea from each other, which have been affected by increased fares and further disruption and delays at airports. The ticket saw a brief boost in sales following the 2010 eruptions of Eyjafjallajökull which grounded all European flights. Virgin Trains increased their London to Holyhead trains by 20,000 seats in response. However, SailRail tickets are not well-known or advertised prominently, and those between London and Dublin cannot save time compared to flying, though this may change with the introduction of improved services such as High Speed 2.

=== History ===
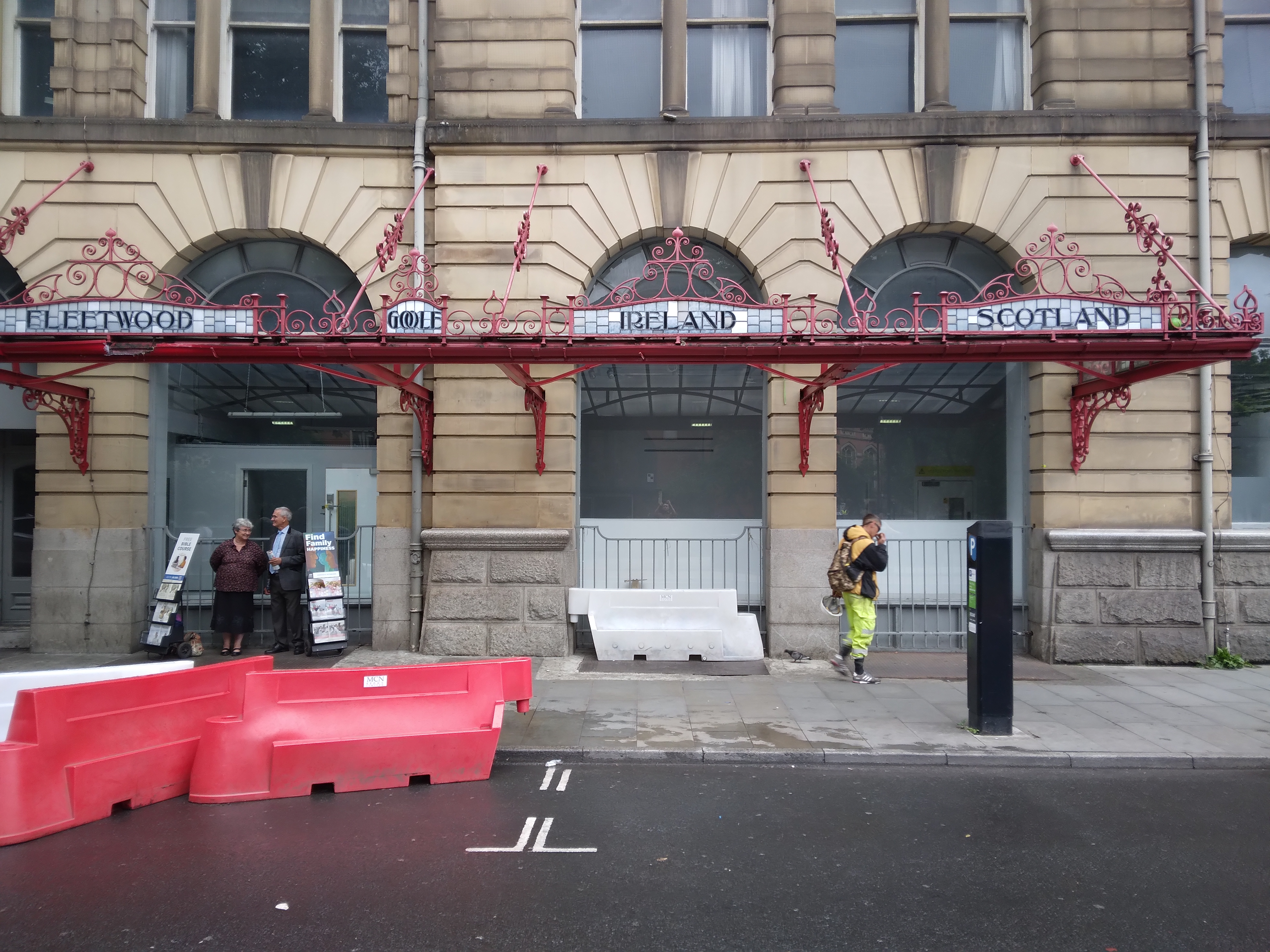
The station façade at Manchester Victoria, and canopy with names of destinations reachable by rail from Manchester, including Ireland

The SailRail brand name was in use by 2005, at which time it was described as "an alliance of UK Train operating companies and ferry companies operating on the Irish Sea" and providing an "alternative to budget airline travel". By 2006 bookings could be made by telephone, at railway stations or at travel agencies, and a website showed the range of fares available. The three ferry routes for which SailRail fares were available were Stranraer to Belfast (operated by Stena Line; railhead Stranraer), Holyhead to Dublin or Dún Laoghaire (Irish Ferries; railhead Holyhead) and Fishguard to Rosslare Europort (Stena Line; railhead Fishguard Harbour).

The scheme was changed in 2012 with the introduction of two fare classes: Advance, which could be purchased up to the day before travel, and Standby, which could be booked at any time. For each of the three routes, all railway stations in England, Wales and Scotland were allocated to one of five fare zones based on distance to the railhead. The same fare was then charged regardless of the destination in Ireland. It was also at this time that the SailRail brand name began to be used on tickets. Subsequent changes included the loss of Dún Laoghaire as a destination in 2015 after all passenger ferry services were concentrated on Dublin Port, and the introduction of different fares on the Holyhead–Dublin depending on whether the Stena Line passenger ferry, Stena Line catamaran or Irish Ferries catamaran was used (by 2019 both companies were operating on this route.)

In November 2011, ferries on the Belfast route stopped using Stranraer Harbour as their Scottish destination and instead moved to the larger port of Cairnryan Harbour. Since that time, SailRail tickets issued for this route have included the price of a connecting coach service which runs from Stranraer railway station to the port. On this route tickets are issued as standard singles or returns and can be bought up to the time of travel: there are no "Advance" or "Standby" categories.

SailRail tickets can still be booked at any National Rail station or travel agent, as well as online. There are also ticket desks equipped with National Rail-accredited ticket issuing equipment at the Stena Line offices at Holyhead ferry terminal and Belfast ferry terminal.

SailRail tickets to Dublin were temporarily suspended in 2025, after extensive storm damage at the Port of Holyhead meant connections between rail and ferry could no longer be guaranteed.

== Other British schemes ==
Another SailRail-esque scheme, branded 'DutchFlyer', allows travel between any Greater Anglia station (such as Liverpool Street or Colchester Town) to Hook of Holland via ferry from Harwich. Onward travel used to then be available to any station in the Netherlands by Nederlandse Spoorwegen services and included in the fare, but as of early 2023, this is only the case on the UK end with tickets issued from/to 'Any Greater Anglia station', then onward travel from Hook of Holland is purchased separately. The alternative name "GoLondon" was used for tickets issued in the Netherlands until the early 2000s, and tickets issued in the Netherlands were only available to London or Cambridge. Heavy rail services at Hook of Holland ceased with effect from 1 April 2017 in preparation for the conversion of the line into a rapid transit line for the Rotterdam Metro. DutchFlyer tickets were valid on the replacement buses.

Historically, SailRail tickets could be bought to travel from London to Paris via Dover and Calais, Folkestone and Boulogne, or Newhaven and Dieppe. The Dover to Calais scheme was discontinued following the opening of the Channel Tunnel in 1994, though it is still possible to travel as a foot passenger.

== United States ==
In California, a Sail & Rail ticket can be purchased to travel between Sonoma, Marin and San Francisco via the Golden Gate Ferry.
