= The Minch =

Strait in Scotland

- A' Mhaoil (Scottish Gaelic)
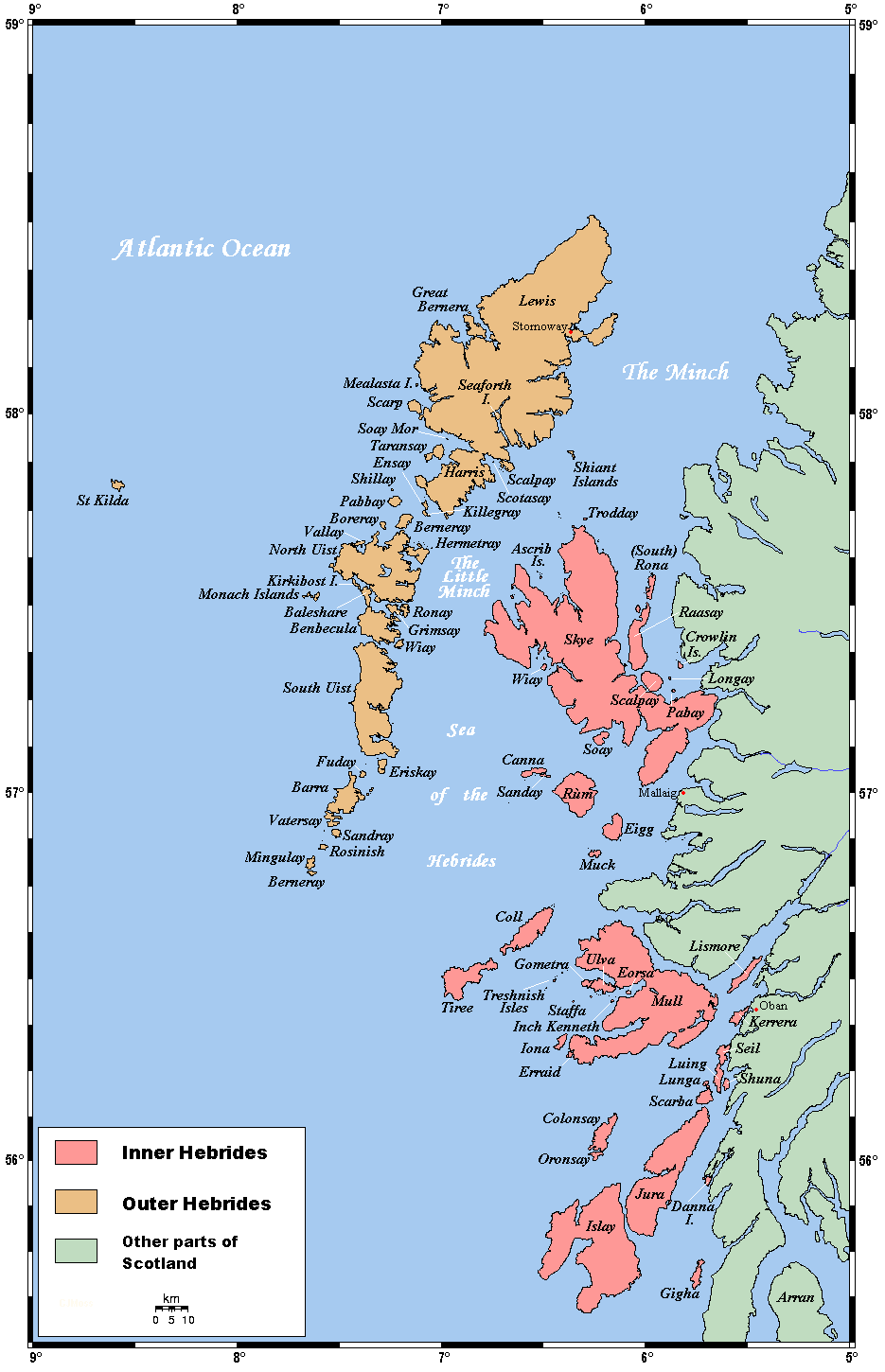
- Map of the Hebrides, showing the Minch

- Location within Scotland
- Location: Outer Hebrides
- Coordinates: 58°04′59″N 05°59′55″W
- Type: Strait
- Frozen: No

The Minch (Scottish Gaelic: A' Mhaoil) is a strait in north-west Scotland that separates the mainland from Lewis and Harris in the Outer Hebrides. It was known as Skotlandsfjörð ("Scotland's firth") in Old Norse.

The Minch's southern extension, which separates Skye from the middle islands of the Hebridean chain, is known as the Little Minch. It opens into the Sea of the Hebrides.

== Geography ==
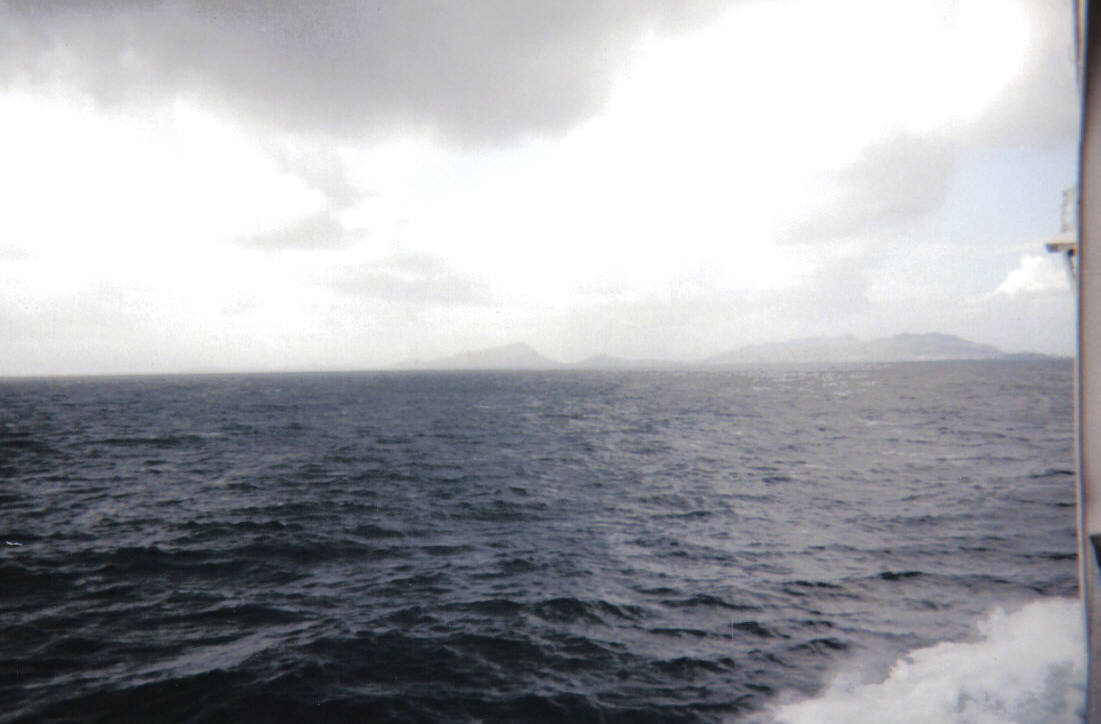
The Little Minch, view towards Loch nam Madadh

The Minch and Little Minch form part of the Inner Seas off the West Coast of Scotland, as defined by the International Hydrographic Organization.

The Minch ranges from 14 to 45 miles (23 to 72 km) wide and is approximately 70 miles (110 km) long. The Minch has been proposed as the location of an asteroid impact around 1 billion years ago, that created the sediments of the Stac Fada Member. The Little Minch is about 15 miles (24 km) wide. In June 2010 Eilidh Macdonald became the first person to swim across it from Waternish Point on Skye to Rodel on Harris, in a time of 9 1/2 hours.

== Navigation ==
A traffic separation scheme operates in the Little Minch, with northbound traffic proceeding close to Skye, and southbound close to Harris. Commercial ferry services across the Minch are operated by Caledonian MacBrayne.

=== Lighthouses ===
In the south, its entrance is marked by lighthouses at Barra Head, Ushenish and Hyskeir. On Skye, there are lights at Neist Point, Vaternish and An t-Iasgair. The Outer Hebrides are marked by Weavers Point, Eilean Glas, Tiumpan Head and Butt of Lewis. To the east are Rubha Réidh, Stoer Head and Cape Wrath lighthouses.

=== Other navigational aids ===
A buoy marks Eugenie Rock (named after the vessel which grounded there in May 1859) and the nearby Sgeir Graidach. Previously, these hazards were marked by a red-painted beacon on Sgeir Graidach, the foundations of which can still be seen at low tide.

== Mythology ==
The mythological blue men of the Minch live in the area.

== Conservation ==
The Minch Project is a collaboration of Comhairle nan Eilean Siar, the Highland Council and Scottish Natural Heritage that aims to reduce pollution, minimise erosion, minimise litter and promote tourism in the Minch, particularly wildlife tourism such as dolphin watching. Pollution is a particular concern as the Minch is a busy shipping lane; 2.5 million tonnes (2.8 million short tons) of shipping pass through the channel each month.

== See also ==
- Mid-Minch Gaelic
