= Inner Seas off the West Coast of Scotland =

Marine area between the Scottish mainland, the Outer Hebrides and Ireland

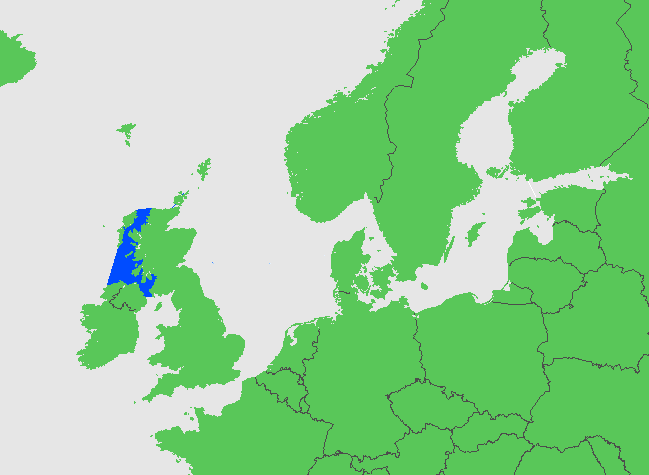
IHO region Inner Seas off the West Coast of Scotland

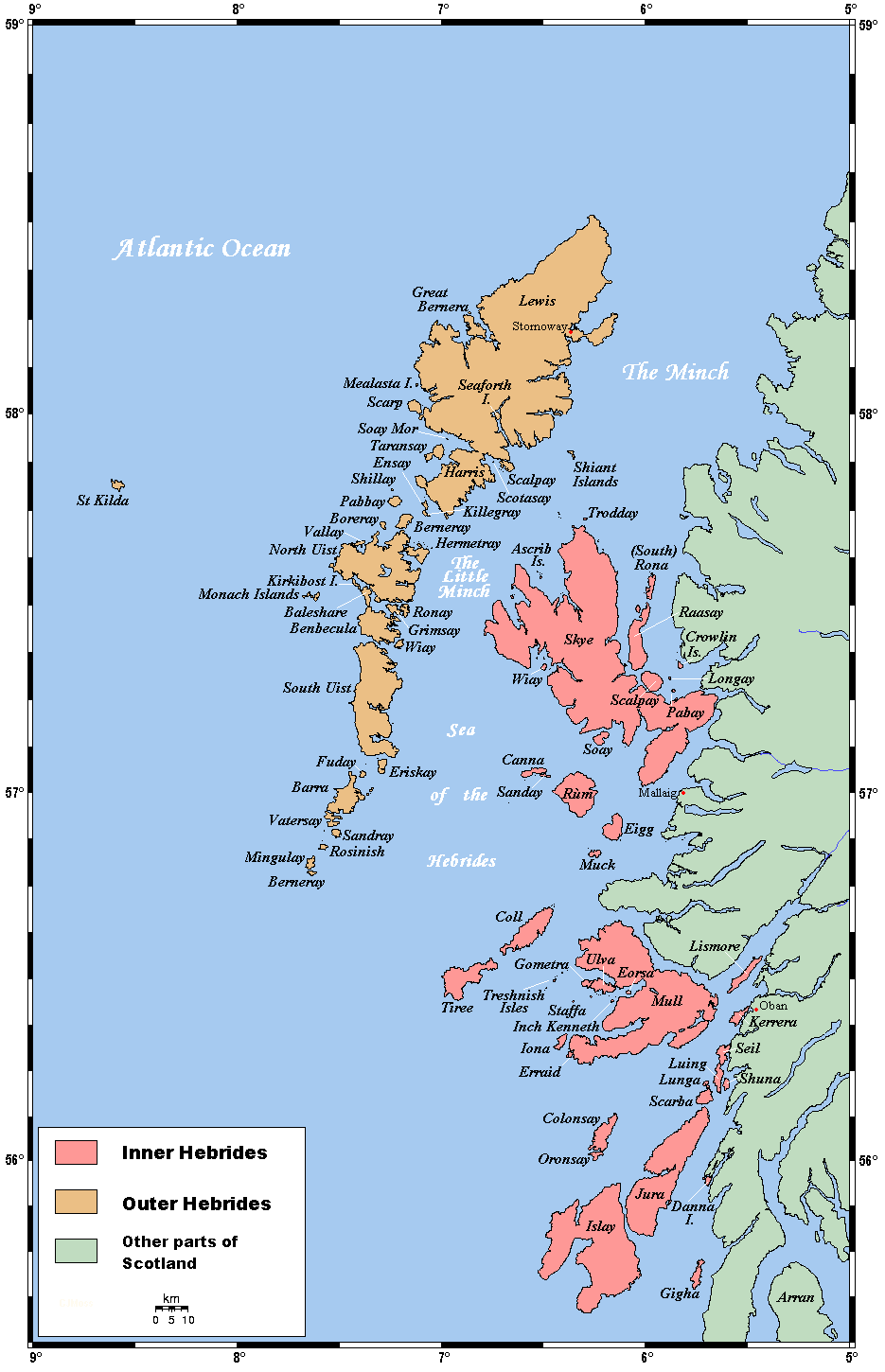
Map showing Western Scottish waters - these form part of the Inner Seas.

The Inner Seas off the West Coast of Scotland is a marine area designated by the International Hydrographic Organization (IHO). It consists of a number of waterbodies between the Scottish mainland, the Outer Hebrides islands, and the coast of Ireland.

Waterbodies within the Inner Seas include the Minch and Little Minch, the Sound of Harris, the Inner Sound, the Sea of the Hebrides, the Firth of Lorn, the Sound of Jura, the Firth of Clyde, Belfast Lough and the North Channel. The IHO defines the limits of the Inner Seas as follows:

On the West and North. A line running from Bloody Foreland (55°10′N 8°17′W) in Ireland to the West point of Tory Island, on to Barra Head, the Southwest point of the Hebrides, thence through these islands, in such a manner that the West coasts of the main islands appertain to the Atlantic Ocean and all the narrow waters appertain to the Inner Seas, as far as the Butt of Lewis (North Point), and thence to Cape Wrath (58°37'N) in Scotland.

On the South. A line joining the South extreme of the Mull of Galloway (54°38'N) in Scotland and Ballyquintin Point (54°20'N) in Ireland.

== See also ==
- Malin Sea
