= Cairns of Coll =

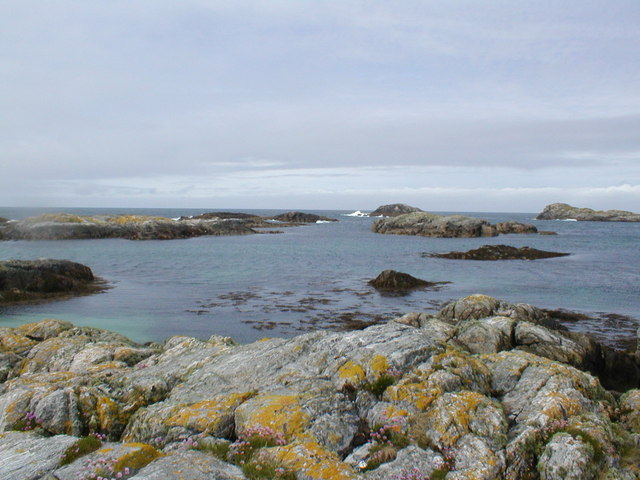
View of the skerries around Eilean Mòr from the vicinity of Sgeir Stangail

The Cairns of Coll refers primarily to a region of rocky outcrops in shallow waters extending from the north end of the Island of Coll in the Inner Hebrides of Scotland. The extension is about 1.1 miles from shore, 1.6 if the Cairns of Coll Rocks 0.5 miles further are to be included. The outcrops of the Cairns are too small to be inhabited. The swift and unpredictable tidal currents between them make navigation hazardous to boats. They are rich in abundant and varied marine life, including the marine mammals.

In 2014, the Cairns of Coll were purchased for £300,000 by author Alexander McCall Smith, who expressed an intent to deed the islands back to the nation as a wildlife sanctuary on his death.

== Geography ==
Some several dozen sgeiran (skerries) are arranged in groups around three islets. The largest group, that around Eilean Mòr, comprises also about 40 skerries. Only the largest have been named. They include Sgeir Ghlas, Sgeir Leathan, Sgeir Eoin Bhàin, Sgeiran nan Cuiseag, and Sgeir an Otraich. To the northeast is Eag na Maoile and about 15 skerries. To the northwest of it, and north of Eilean Mòr, is Sùil Ghorm, which has a lighthouse, and about 15 skerries. There are more outcrops between Eilean Mòr and Coll. Seen as real estate, the package includes or once included a house on the north coast of Coll.

The light is placed on the outermost buildable land of the Cairns, but not on the outermost outcrop. A half-mile further out is a group of two outcrops barely breaking the surface at high tide, an extreme hazard. In the nautical books and charts of the 19th and earlier 20th centuries these were named the Cairns of Coll. It is not certain whether the name referred only to the two rocks or was a title for the whole group. In the later 20th century some nautical documents began to refer to them as the Cairns of Coll Rocks, to be considered as being in the Cairns of Coll. Otherwise the meaning must be gleaned from the context.

A navigational work of the late 19th century reports: "The passage between the Cairns of Coll and Suil Ghorm is half a mile across, and affords a deep clear channel, though it should never be used except by persons possessing local knowledge, as the tides run with considerable velocity." "Persons possessing local knowledge" refers to a maritime pilot, who was employed ubiquitously for navigation in coastal and inland waters in the age before electronic navigation. Today's maritime road around Coll lies well to the north of the Cairns of Coll Rocks.

== Lighthouse ==
Cairns of Coll Light
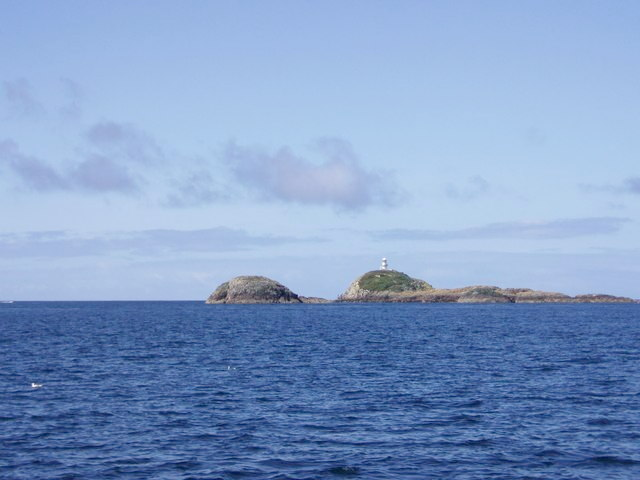
- Location: Coll, Argyll and Bute, United Kingdom
- Coordinates: 56°42′16″N 6°26′43″W

Tower
- Constructed: 1909
- Designed by: David Alan Stevenson, Charles Alexander Stevenson
- Construction: metal
- Height: 7 m (23 ft)
- Shape: cylindrical tower with balcony and lantern
- Markings: white (tower), white (lantern)
- Power source: solar power
- Operator: Northern Lighthouse Board

Light
- Focal height: 23 m (75 ft)
- Characteristic: Fl W 12s

Being a fatal hazard to unwary deep-water vessels, the Cairns of Coll are marked by a beacon constructed on Sùil Ghorm, called variously the Coll, Cairns of Coll, or Sùil Ghorm light, lighthouse, or beacon. Work has been done on it repeatedly for varying lengths of time. The year of first construction is 1909. It is a design of David Alan Stevenson and Charles Alexander Stevenson who were engineers of the noted Stevenson family, which worked for generations for the Northern Lighthouse Board. The lighthouse is a metal tower with gallery and lantern painted white, powered by solar panel, emits a white flash every 12 seconds and is operated by Northern Lighthouse Board.

== See also ==
- List of lighthouses in Scotland
- List of Northern Lighthouse Board lighthouses
