= Vaternish Lighthouse =

Vaternish Point Lighthouse
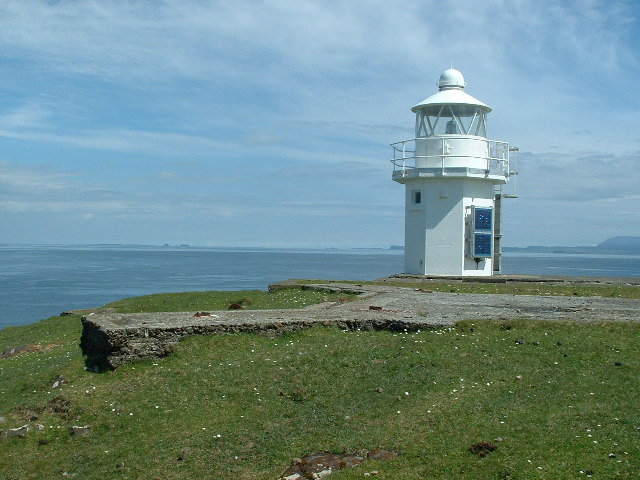
- Vaternish Lighthouse
- Location: Trumpan; Skye; Highland; Scotland
- Coordinates: 57.607736°N 6.634134°W

Tower
- Constructed: 1924 (first)
- Foundation: reinforced concrete
- Construction: metal tower
- Automated: 1980
- Height: 7 metres (23 ft)
- Shape: octagonal tower with balcony and lantern
- Markings: white tower and lantern
- Power source: solar power
- Operator: Northern Lighthouse Board

Light
- First lit: 1980 (current)
- Focal height: 21 metres (69 ft)
- Range: 8 nautical miles (15 km; 9.2 mi)
- Characteristic: Fl W 20s.

Vaternish Lighthouse was built on Waternish Point in 1924. The engineers were David and Charles Stevenson. The original lens was donated to the Museum of Scottish Lighthouses.

The present tower was built in 1980, by engineer John Smith. It consists of a concrete base, aluminium light room and a GRP roof. Solar panels were installed in 2001. It is accessible on foot from the road at Trumpan.

== See also ==
- List of lighthouses in Scotland
- List of Northern Lighthouse Board lighthouses
