= List of lighthouses in Scotland =

This is a list of lighthouses in Scotland. The Northern Lighthouse Board, from which much of the information is derived, are responsible for most lighthouses in Scotland but have handed over responsibility in the major estuaries to the port authorities. Many of the more minor lights are not shown. A lighthouse that is no longer operating is indicated by the date of closure in the operated by column. Where two dates are shown, the lighthouse has been rebuilt.

Nearly all the lighthouses in this list were designed by and most were built by four generations of one family, including Thomas Smith, who was both the stepfather and father-in-law of Robert Stevenson. Robert's sons and grandsons not only built most of the lights, often under the most appalling of conditions, but pioneered many of the improvements in lighting and signalling that cut down the enormous loss of life in shipping around the coasts of Scotland.

The table may be sorted by any column by clicking on the heading.

== Lighthouses ==
Name	Image	Area coordinates	Island / mainland	Year built	Designed / built by	Operated by / closed	Tower height	Focal height	Range
Ailsa Craig Lighthouse		South Ayrshire	Ailsa Craig	1886	Thomas Stevenson, David A Stevenson	Northern Lighthouse Board	11	18	17
Ardnamurchan Lighthouse		Highland	mainland	1849	Alan Stevenson	Northern Lighthouse Board	35	55	24
Auskerry Lighthouse		Orkney Islands	Auskerry	1866	David Stevenson, Thomas Stevenson	Northern Lighthouse Board	34	34	20
Barns Ness Lighthouse		East Lothian	mainland	1899	David A Stevenson, Charles A Stevenson	Deactivated 2005	37	36	10
Barra Head Lighthouse		Outer Hebrides	Barra Head	1833	Robert Stevenson	Northern Lighthouse Board	18	208	18
Bass Rock Lighthouse		East Lothian	Bass Rock	1902	David Stevenson	Northern Lighthouse Board	20	46	10
Bell Rock Lighthouse		Angus	Inchcape	1810	Robert Stevenson	Northern Lighthouse Board	36	28	18
Bressay Lighthouse		Shetland Islands	Bressay	1858	David Stevenson, Thomas Stevenson	Northern Lighthouse Board (until Sep 2012), Lerwick Port Authority (from 2012)	16	32	23, 10
Brough of Birsay Lighthouse		Orkney Islands	Brough of Birsay	1925	David A Stevenson	Northern Lighthouse Board	11	52	18
Buchan Ness Lighthouse		Aberdeenshire	mainland	1827	Robert Stevenson	Northern Lighthouse Board	35	40	18
Butt of Lewis Lighthouse		Outer Hebrides	Isle of Lewis	1862	David Stevenson	Northern Lighthouse Board	37	52	25
Cantick Head Lighthouse		Orkney Islands	South Walls	1858	David Stevenson, Thomas Stevenson	Northern Lighthouse Board	22	35	13, 18
Cape Wrath Lighthouse		Highland	mainland	1828	Robert Stevenson	Northern Lighthouse Board	20	122	22
Chanonry Point Lighthouse		Highland, Fortrose	mainland	1846	Alan Stevenson	Northern Lighthouse Board	13	12	15
Cloch lighthouse		Inverclyde	mainland	1797	Thomas Smith, Robert Stevenson	Clyde Port Authority	23	24	8
Copinsay Lighthouse		Orkney Islands	Copinsay	1915	David A Stevenson	Northern Lighthouse Board	16	79	21
Corran Point Lighthouse		Highland	mainland	1817	Thomas Smith, Robert Stevenson	Northern Lighthouse Board	13	12	10 (white), 7 (red & green)
Corsewall Lighthouse		Dumfries and Galloway	mainland	1816	Robert Stevenson	Northern Lighthouse Board	34	34	22
Covesea Skerries Lighthouse		Moray, Lossiemouth and Branderburgh	mainland	1846	Alan Stevenson	Northern Lighthouse Board (until 2012)	36	49	24
Crammag Head Lighthouse		Dumfries and Galloway	mainland	1913	David A Stevenson	Northern Lighthouse Board	7	35	18
Cromarty Lighthouse		Highland	mainland	1846	Alan Stevenson	Inactive	13	18	
Davaar Lighthouse		Argyll and Bute	Island Davaar	1854	David Stevenson, Thomas Stevenson, and John Barr & Co	Northern Lighthouse Board	20	37	23
Dubh Artach Lighthouse		Argyll and Bute	Dubh Artach	1872	Thomas Stevenson	Northern Lighthouse Board	38	44	20
Duncansby Head Lighthouse		Highland	mainland	1924	David A Stevenson	Northern Lighthouse Board	11	67	22
Dunnet Head Lighthouse		Highland	mainland	1831	Robert Stevenson	Northern Lighthouse Board	20	105	23
Eilean Glas Lighthouse		Outer Hebrides	Scalpay	1789	Thomas Smith	Northern Lighthouse Board	30	43	23
Elie Ness Lighthouse		Fife	mainland	1908	James Laurie	Forth Ports	11	15	17
Esha Ness Lighthouse		Shetland Islands	Mainland	1925	David A Stevenson	Northern Lighthouse Board	12	61	25
Fair Isle North Lighthouse		Shetland Islands	Fair Isle	1892	David A Stevenson, Charles A Stevenson	Northern Lighthouse Board	14	80	22
South Lighthouse		Shetland Islands	Fair Isle	1892	David A Stevenson, Charles A Stevenson	Northern Lighthouse Board	26	32	22
Fidra Lighthouse		East Lothian	Fidra	1885	David A Stevenson, Thomas Stevenson	Forth Ports	17	34	15
Fife Ness Lighthouse		Fife	mainland	1975	Peter H. Hyslop	Northern Lighthouse Board	5	12	21 (white), 20 (red)
Firths Voe Lighthouse		Shetland Islands, Delting	Mainland	1909	David A Stevenson	Northern Lighthouse Board	9	9	15 (white), 10 (green), 10 (red)
Flannan Isles Lighthouse		Outer Hebrides	Eilean Mòr	1899	David A Stevenson	Northern Lighthouse Board	23	101	20
Foula Lighthouse		Shetland Islands	Foula	1986	James Johnson	Northern Lighthouse Board	8	36	18
Girdleness Lighthouse		Aberdeen	mainland	1833	Robert Stevenson	Northern Lighthouse Board	37	56	22
Holburn Head Lighthouse		Highland, Thurso	mainland	1862	David Stevenson, Thomas Stevenson	Deactivated 2003	17	23	15
Holy Isle Inner Lighthouse		North Ayrshire	Holy Island	1877	Thomas Stevenson, David Stevenson	Northern Lighthouse Board	17	14	6
Holy Isle Outer Lighthouse		North Ayrshire	Holy Island	1905	Thomas Stevenson, David Stevenson	Northern Lighthouse Board	23	38	25
Hoxa Head Lighthouse		Orkney Islands	South Ronaldsay	1901 (Note: Replaced with modern lighthouse in 1996.)	David A Stevenson	Northern Lighthouse Board			
Hoxa Head Lighthouse		Orkney Islands	South Ronaldsay	1996		Northern Lighthouse Board	7	15	9 (white), 6 (red)
Hoy Sound High Light		Orkney Islands	Graemsay	1851	Alan Stevenson	Northern Lighthouse Board	33	35	20 (white), 16 (red)
Hoy Sound Low Light		Orkney Islands	Graemsay	1851	Alan Stevenson	Northern Lighthouse Board	12	17	12
Hyskeir Lighthouse		Highland	Hyskeir	1904	David A Stevenson, Charles A Stevenson	Northern Lighthouse Board	39	41	24
Inchkeith Lighthouse		Fife	Inchkeith	1804	Thomas Smith, Robert Stevenson	Forth Ports (from Jun 2013), Northern Lighthouse Board (from 1804, until Jun 2013)	19	67	14
Isle of May Lighthouse		Fife	Isle of May	1816	Robert Stevenson	Northern Lighthouse Board	24	73	22
Isle of May Low Light		Fife	Isle of May	1843					
Old Isle of May Lighthouse		Fife	Isle of May	1635		James Maxwell, 1st Earl of Dirletoun			
Killantringan Lighthouse		Dumfries and Galloway	mainland	1900	David A Stevenson	Deactivated 2007	22	49	25
New Kinnaird Head Lighthouse		Aberdeenshire	mainland	1991		Northern Lighthouse Board	10	25	22
Kinnaird Head Lighthouse		Aberdeenshire	mainland	1787	Thomas Smith	Northern Lighthouse Board (from 1787, until 1991), Museum of Scottish Lighthouses (from 1991)	22		
Lady Isle Lighthouse		South Ayrshire	Lady Isle	1903	David A Stevenson	Northern Lighthouse Board	15	19	11
Lismore Lighthouse		Argyll and Bute	Eilean Musdile	1833	Robert Stevenson	Northern Lighthouse Board	26	31	17
Little Cumbrae Old Lighthouse		North Ayrshire	Little Cumbrae Island	1757	James Ewing				
Cumbrae Lighthouse		North Ayrshire	Little Cumbrae Island	1793	Thomas Smith	Northern Lighthouse Board			
Little Cumbrae New Lighthouse		North Ayrshire	Little Cumbrae Island	1997		Clyde Port Authority		28	14
Little Ross lighthouse		Dumfries and Galloway	Little Ross	1843	Alan Stevenson	Northern Lighthouse Board	22	50	12
Lother Rock Light		Orkney Islands	Lother Rock	1910	David A Stevenson	Northern Lighthouse Board	12	13	6
Old Monach Lighthouse		Outer Hebrides	Shillay	1864	Thomas Stevenson, David Stevenson	Northern Lighthouse Board	41	47	18
New Monach Light		Outer Hebrides	Shillay	1997		Northern Lighthouse Board	5.5		10
Muckle Flugga Lighthouse		Shetland Islands	Muckle Flugga		Thomas Stevenson, David Stevenson	Northern Lighthouse Board	20	66	22
Mull of Galloway Lighthouse		Dumfries and Galloway	mainland	1830	Robert Stevenson	Northern Lighthouse Board	26	99	28
Mull of Kintyre Lighthouse		Argyll and Bute	mainland	1788	Thomas Smith	Northern Lighthouse Board	12	91	24
Neist Point Lighthouse		Highland	Duirinish peninsula	1909	David A Stevenson	Northern Lighthouse Board	19	43	16
North Rona Lighthouse		Outer Hebrides	Rona	1984		Northern Lighthouse Board	13	114	22
North Ronaldsay Lighthouse		Orkney Islands	North Ronaldsay	1852	Alan Stevenson	Northern Lighthouse Board	42	43	24
Dennis Head Old Beacon		Orkney Islands	North Ronaldsay	1789	Thomas Smith, Robert Stevenson		21		
Noss Head Lighthouse		Highland	mainland	1849	Alan Stevenson	Northern Lighthouse Board	18	53	25 (white), 21 (red)
Noup Head Lighthouse		Orkney Islands	Westray	1898	David A Stevenson, Charles A Stevenson	Northern Lighthouse Board	24	79	22
Ornsay Lighthouse		Highland	Ornsay	1857	Thomas Stevenson, David Stevenson	Northern Lighthouse Board	19	18	12
Bound Skerry Lighthouse		Shetland Islands	Bound Skerry	1858	David Stevenson, Thomas Stevenson	Northern Lighthouse Board	30	44	20
Oxcars Lighthouse		Fife	rock	1886	David A Stevenson, Thomas Stevenson	Forth Ports	22	16	13
Pentland Skerries High Light		Orkney Islands	Muckle Skerry	1794	Thomas Smith, Robert Stevenson	Northern Lighthouse Board	36	52	23
Pladda Lighthouse		North Ayrshire	Pladda	1790	Thomas Smith	Northern Lighthouse Board	29	40	17
Fethaland Lighthouse		Shetland Islands	Mainland	1977		Northern Lighthouse Board	7	67	19 (white), 15 (red)
Point of Sleat Lighthouse		Highland	Isle of Skye	2003		Northern Lighthouse Board	5	20	9
Rattray Head lighthouse		Aberdeenshire	rock with causeway	1895	David A Stevenson, Charles A Stevenson	Northern Lighthouse Board	34	28	18
Rinns of Islay Lighthouse		Argyll and Bute	Orsay	1825	Robert Stevenson	Northern Lighthouse Board	29	46	24
Rona Lighthouse		Highland	Rona	1857	David Stevenson, Thomas Stevenson	Northern Lighthouse Board	13	69	19
Rose Ness Lighthouse, Orkney		Orkney Islands, Holm							
Rua Reidh Lighthouse		Highland	mainland	1912	David A Stevenson	Northern Lighthouse Board	25	37	24
Rubha nan Gall Lighthouse		Argyll and Bute	Isle of Mull	1857	Thomas Stevenson, David Stevenson	Northern Lighthouse Board	19	17	15
Ruvaal Lighthouse		Argyll and Bute, Killarow and Kilmeny	Islay	1859	David Stevenson, Thomas Stevenson	Northern Lighthouse Board	34	45	19
Sanda Island Lighthouse		Argyll and Bute	Sanda Island	1850	Alan Stevenson	Northern Lighthouse Board	15	50	15
Scarinish Lighthouse		Argyll and Bute	Tiree	1897	David A Stevenson	Northern Lighthouse Board	3.5	11	12
Scurdie Ness Lighthouse		Angus	mainland	1870	David Stevenson	Northern Lighthouse Board	39	38	23
Skerryvore Lighthouse		Argyll and Bute	Skerryvore	1844	Alan Stevenson	Northern Lighthouse Board	48	46	23
Southerness Lighthouse		Dumfries and Galloway	mainland	1749 (Note: Built in 1748 but not lit till 1800. Rebuilt in 1844.)	Deactivated in 1931.		10	17	
St. Abbs Lighthouse		Scottish Borders	mainland	1862	Alan Stevenson, David Stevenson	Northern Lighthouse Board	9	68	26
Start Point Lighthouse		Orkney Islands	Sanday	1806	Robert Stevenson	Northern Lighthouse Board	25	24	18
Stoer Head Lighthouse		Highland	mainland	1870	Thomas Stevenson, David Stevenson	National Trust for Scotland, Northern Lighthouse Board	14	59	24
Strathy Point Lighthouse		Highland	mainland	1958	Peter H. Hyslop	Northern Lighthouse Board (until 2012)	14	45	26
Stroma Lighthouse		Highland	Island of Stroma	1890	Charles A Stevenson, David A Stevenson	Northern Lighthouse Board	23	32	20
Sule Skerry Lighthouse		Orkney Islands	Sule Skerry	1895	David A Stevenson, Charles A Stevenson	Northern Lighthouse Board	27	34	21
Sumburgh Head Lighthouse		Shetland Islands	Mainland	1821	Robert Stevenson	Northern Lighthouse Board	17	91	23
Tarbat Ness Lighthouse		Highland	mainland	1830	Robert Stevenson	Northern Lighthouse Board	41	53	24
Tiumpan Head Lighthouse		Outer Hebrides	Isle of Lewis	1900	David A Stevenson, Charles A Stevenson	Northern Lighthouse Board	21	55	25
Todhead Lighthouse		Aberdeenshire	mainland	1897	David A Stevenson	Northern Lighthouse Board (until 2007)	13	41	18
Tor Ness Lighthouse		Orkney Islands	Hoy	1980	John Smith	Northern Lighthouse Board	8	21	17
Toward Point Lighthouse		Argyll and Bute	mainland	1812	Robert Stevenson	Clyde Port Authority	19	21	22
Turnberry Lighthouse		South Ayrshire, Kirkoswald	mainland	1873	David Stevenson, Thomas Stevenson	Northern Lighthouse Board	24	29	24
Ushenish Lighthouse		Outer Hebrides	South Uist	1857	Thomas Stevenson, David Stevenson	Northern Lighthouse Board	12	54	19 (white), 15 (red)
Vaternish Lighthouse		Highland	Isle of Skye	1980		Northern Lighthouse Board	7	21	8
Vaternish Point Lighthouse		Highland	Isle of Skye	1924	John Smith	Northern Lighthouse Board			
Weavers Point Lighthouse		Outer Hebrides	North Uist	1980	John Smith	Northern Lighthouse Board	4	24	7
Rubh' an Eun Lighthouse		Argyll and Bute							

== See also ==
- Alan Stevenson, David Stevenson, Robert Stevenson (civil engineer), Robert Louis Stevenson
- Lightship
- List of lighthouses in England
- List of lighthouses in Ireland
- List of lighthouses in Wales
- List of Northern Lighthouse Board lighthouses
- Lists of lighthouses
- Trinity House of Leith
