= Noup Head Lighthouse =

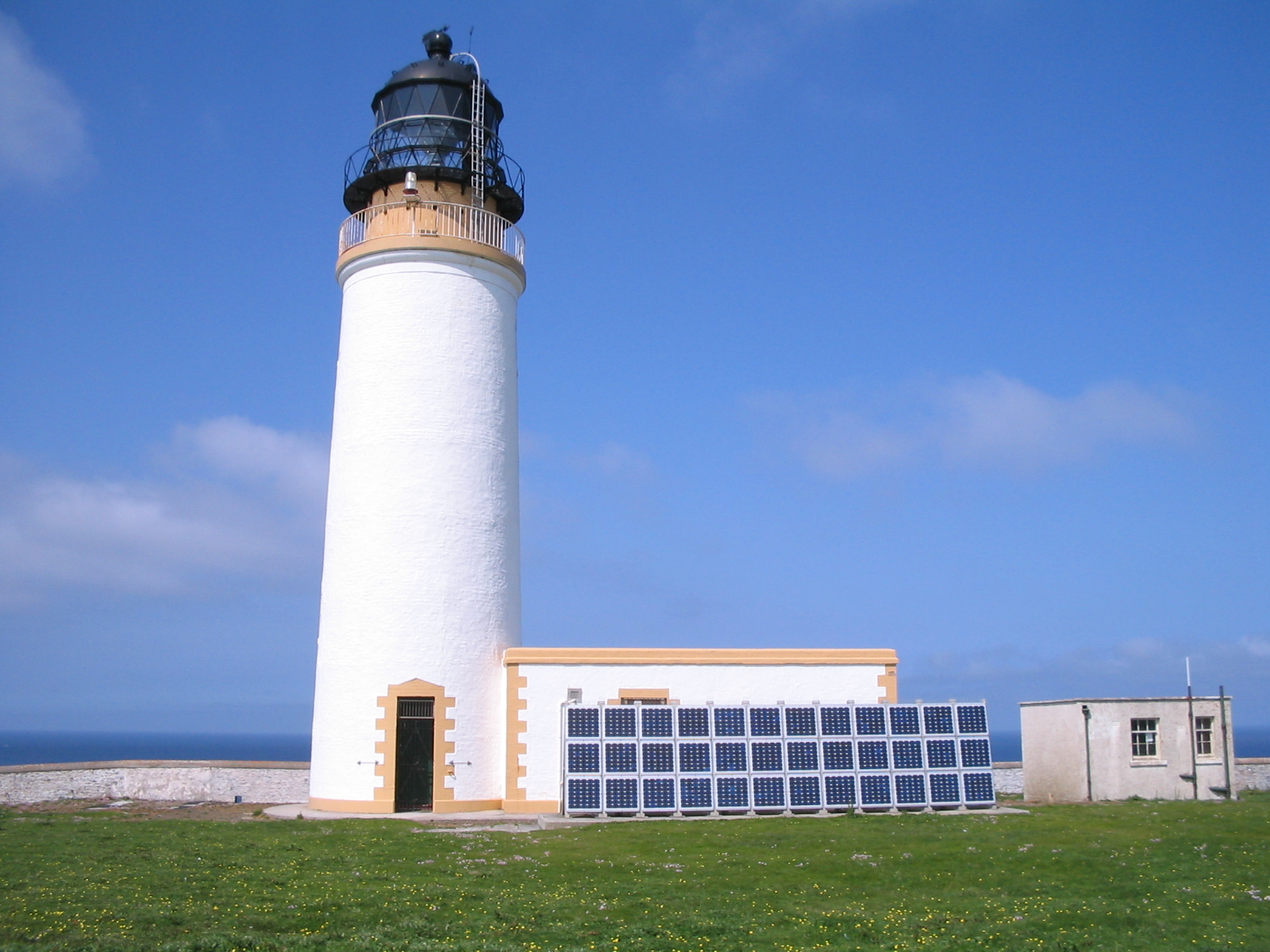
- Noup Head Lighthouse in 2006
- Location: Noup Head; Westray; Orkney; Scotland
- OS grid: HY3920049902
- Coordinates: 59.331104°N 3.070324°W

Tower
- Constructed: 1898
- Built by: David Alan Stevenson, Charles Alexander Stevenson
- Construction: masonry tower
- Automated: 1964
- Height: 24 metres (79 ft)
- Shape: cylindrical tower with balcony and lantern
- Markings: white tower, black lantern, ochre trim
- Power source: solar power
- Operator: Northern Lighthouse Board
- Heritage: category B listed building

Light
- Focal height: 79 metres (259 ft)
- Range: 22 nautical miles (41 km; 25 mi)
- Characteristic: Fl W 30s.

Noup Head Lighthouse lies on the north west headland of the isle of Westray, in Orkney, Scotland. It was constructed by David A Stevenson in 1898 for the Northern Lighthouse Board.

The lighthouse became automatic in 1964 and was converted to wind and solar power using a solar array in 2000.

== See also ==
- List of lighthouses in Scotland
- List of Northern Lighthouse Board lighthouses
