= Lady's Rock =

Lady's Rock Lighthouse
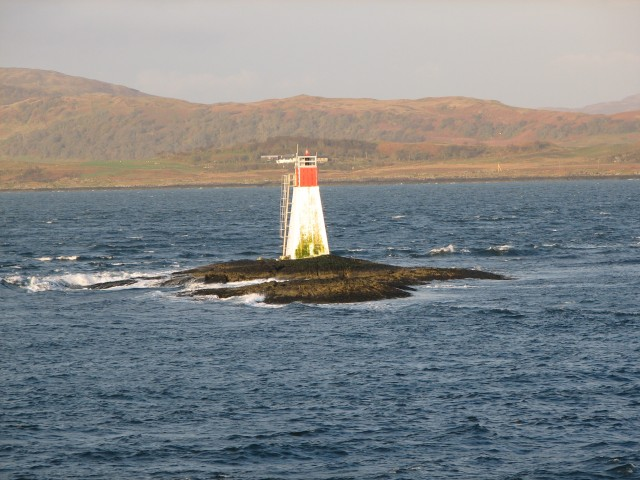
- Lady's Rock with Isle of Mull in the background.
- Location: Lady's Rock; Argyll and Bute; Scotland; United Kingdom
- Coordinates: 56.448515°N 5.617230°W

Tower
- Constructed: 1907 (first)
- Construction: lower stone tower and upper skeletal tower covered by aluminium panels with light on the top
- Automated: 2001
- Height: 12 m (39 ft)
- Shape: square frustum tower
- Markings: white tower, red aluminium panels on the top
- Power source: solar power
- Operator: Northern Lighthouse Board

Light
- First lit: 2001 (current)
- Focal height: 12 m (39 ft)
- Range: 5 nmi (9 km)
- Characteristic: Fl W 6 s

Lady's Rock is an uninhabited skerry to the south west of Lismore in the Inner Hebrides. It is submerged at high tide and carries a navigation beacon. Eilean Musdile is to the north east, next to Lismore.

== History ==
In 1527, Lachlan Maclean of Duart decided to murder his wife, Lady Catherine Campbell, a sister of Archibald Campbell, 4th Earl of Argyll. He rowed out to the rock one night at low tide and left his wife stranded on the rock to die. Looking out the next day from Duart Castle he observed the rock was devoid of life, so he sent a message of condolence to the earl at Inveraray Castle, indicating that he intended to bring his wife's body there for burial. Maclean duly arrived at Inveraray with an entourage of men and the coffin. He was immediately taken to the dining hall of the castle for refreshment only to discover Lady Catherine waiting for him at the head of the table. She had been rescued during the night by boat from Tayvallich (or possibly Lismore) that had passed by the rock.

No word was said of the incident by Argyll or his sister during the meal and Maclean was allowed to make his escape. He was murdered in his bed in Edinburgh some time later by Sir John Campbell of Calder, another of Lady Catherine's brothers.

== See also ==
- List of lighthouses in Scotland
- List of Northern Lighthouse Board lighthouses
