= Barns Ness Lighthouse =

Lighthouse 5 km from Dunbar Scotland

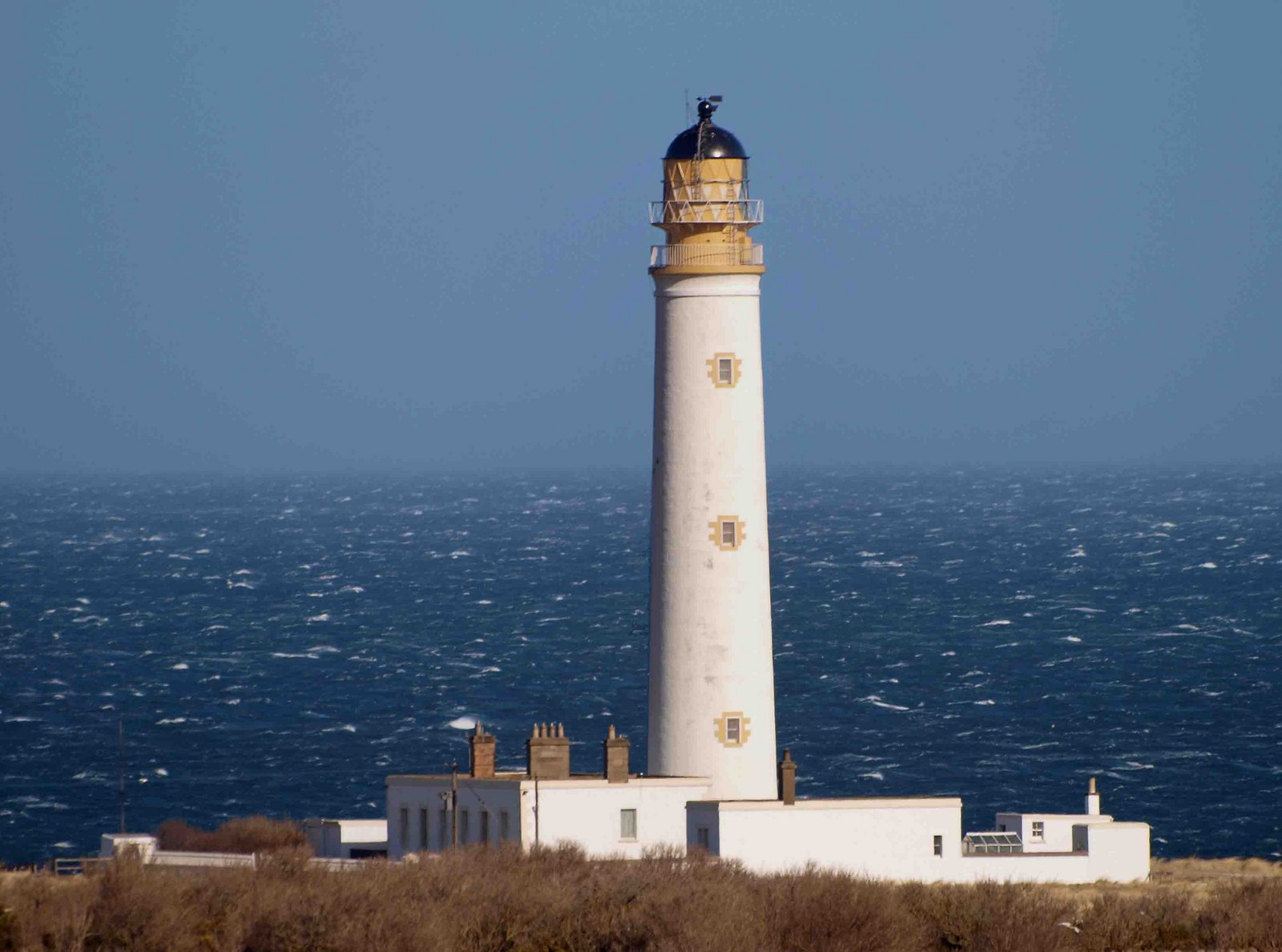
- Barns Ness Lighthouse
- Location: Near Dunbar, East Lothian, Scotland
- OS grid: NT7231777236
- Coordinates: 55°59.2′N 2°26.6′W

Tower
- Constructed: 1899-1901
- Built by: David Alan Stevenson, Charles Alexander Stevenson
- Construction: Stone
- Automated: 1986
- Height: 37 metres (121 ft)
- Shape: Slightly Conical Circular Cylinder
- Markings: White tower
- Heritage: category B listed building

Light
- First lit: 1901
- Deactivated: October, 2005
- Focal height: 118 feet (36 m)
- Intensity: 1,300,000 CD
- Range: 8.7 nautical miles; 10.0 miles (16.1 km)
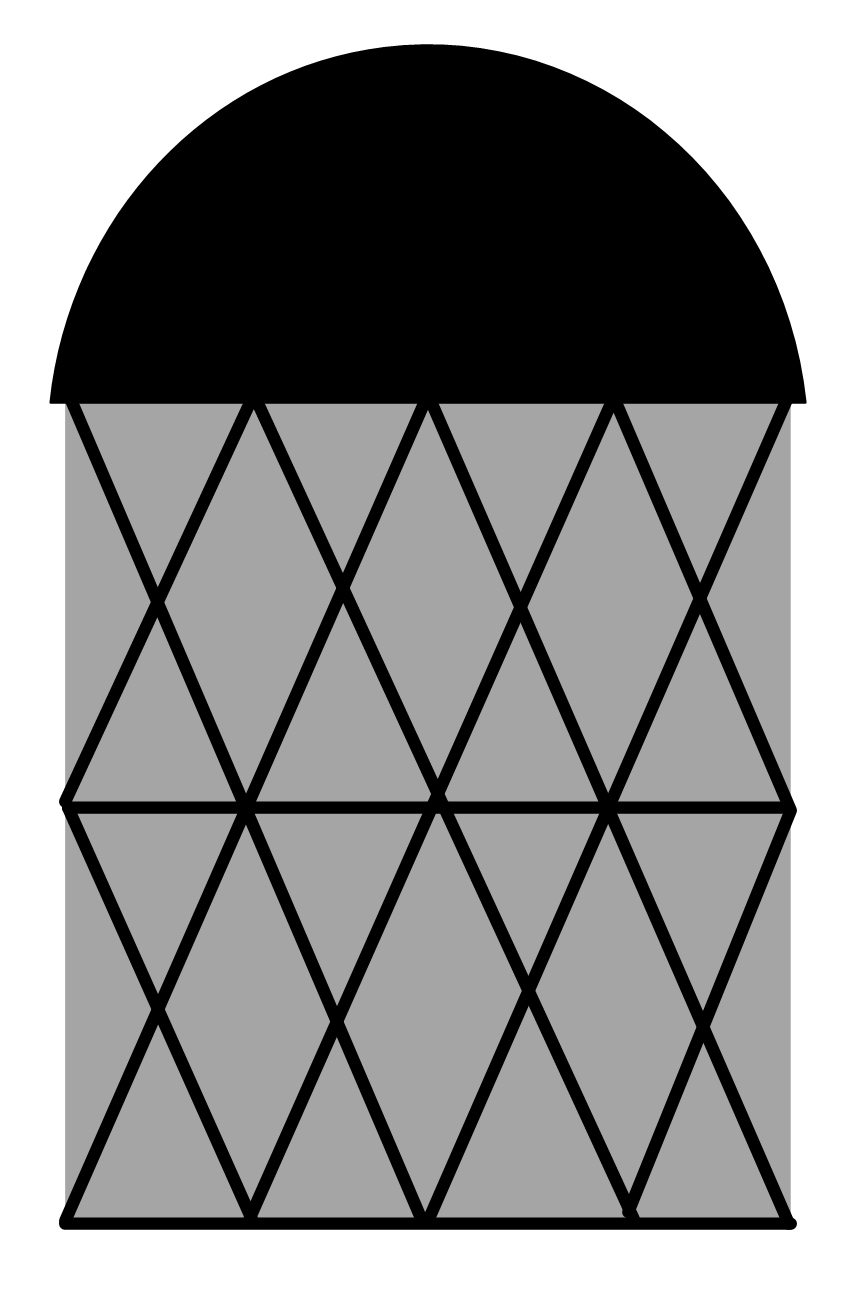
- Characteristic: was Iso W4s 37m 10M Isophase discontinued White every 4 sec. Now discontinued

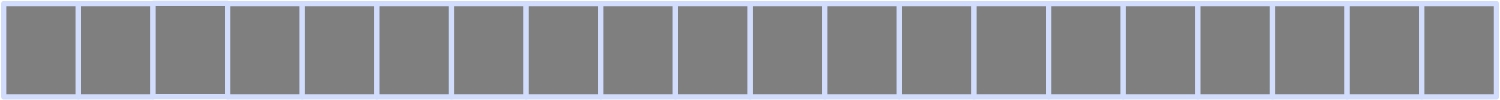

Barns Ness Lighthouse is 3.1 miles (5 km) from Dunbar and was constructed by the engineers and brothers David A. Stevenson and Charles Alexander Stevenson, cousins of the novelist Robert Louis Stevenson, between 1899 and 1901. Taking approximately 2½ years to construct, it was constructed from stone quarried from Craigree (near Cramond) and Barnton. In 1976 it was described as a tall tower, slightly tapered with a circular section having a circular lantern which has triangular panes and a domed roof. The keepers' cottages were, as is typical, one floored, flat roofed buildings which were coated with harling but had their quoins exposed. The lintel above the door to the lighthouse is dated 1901. Within the compound of the lighthouse there was also a sundial and a flagpole.

The stone proved resilient during the Second World War, when the lighthouse was machine-gunned yet sustained no damage.

The lighthouse was staffed by two lighthouse-keepers until 1966 when it was electrified, with a backup generator and emergency battery (used if the generator failed). It remained semi-automated, requiring only a single keeper, until 1986, when it was completely automated. The power of the sealed beam light system was up to 1,300,000 candlepower.

In early 2005, the UK and Ireland lighthouse authorities issued a consultation regarding a review of lighthouses, and it was decided that the Barns Ness Lighthouse was no longer needed. It was deactivated in October 2005. It was put up for sale in 2006.

== See also ==
- List of Northern Lighthouse Board lighthouses
- List of lighthouses in Scotland
