= List of listed buildings in Duirinish, Skye =

This is a list of listed buildings in the parish of Duirinish, on the Isle of Skye in the Highland council area of Scotland.

== List ==
| Name | Location | Date listed | Grid ref. (Note: Sometimes known as OSGB36, the grid reference (where provided) is based on the British national grid reference system used by the Ordnance Survey. • "Guide to National Grid". Ordnance Survey. • "Get-a-map". Ordnance Survey.) | Geo-coordinates | Notes | LB number (Note: Historic Environment Scotland assign a unique alphanumeric identifier to each designated site in Scotland, for listed buildings this always begins with "LB", for example "LB12345".) | Image |
|---|---|---|---|---|---|---|---|
| Stein Village, Gesto Terrace, Cottages (To The Rear Of Macleod Terrace) | | | | 57°30′55″N 6°34′15″W | Category C(S) | 6219 | Upload Photo |
| Dunvegan, The Cottage | | | | 57°27′11″N 6°35′29″W | Category C(S) | 464 | Upload Photo |
| Fairy Bridge | | | | 57°28′14″N 6°32′29″W | Category C(S) | 466 | Upload another image See more images |
| Greshornish, The Orde Of Greshornish | | | | 57°29′58″N 6°26′20″W | Category B | 6376 | Upload Photo |
| Stein Village, Macleod Terrace, The Captain's House, The Beaton House;The Store, The Old Post Office And The Tearoom With House (Greenhalgh) | | | | 57°30′54″N 6°34′17″W | Category C(S) | 6220 | Upload Photo |
| Orbost House | | | | 57°23′42″N 6°34′00″W | Category B | 476 | Upload another image See more images |
| Glendale, Meanish Pier, Former Wool Store | | | | 57°27′21″N 6°44′51″W | Category B | 482 | Upload Photo |
| 10 Upper Milovaig Enclosing Wall And Steading | | | | 57°26′42″N 6°44′22″W | Category B | 484 | Upload Photo |
| 1 Colbost, House And Former Still House Now Croft Museum | | | | 57°26′35″N 6°38′31″W | Category B | 496 | Upload Photo |
| Dunvegan Parish Church (Church Of Scotland) | | | | 57°26′18″N 6°34′59″W | Category A | 498 | Upload another image See more images |
| Dunvegan Castle, including approach causeway and bridges | | | | 57°26′55″N 6°35′24″W | Category A | 501 | Upload another image See more images |
| Laundry Cottage, Dunvegan Castle | | | | 57°26′52″N 6°35′28″W | Category A | 503 | Upload another image See more images |
| Stein, Macleod Terrace, Henderson's House | | | | 57°30′54″N 6°34′17″W | Category B | 478 | Upload Photo |
| Sheep Fank And Wash, Near Glendale | | | | 57°26′36″N 6°44′46″W | Category B | 483 | Upload Photo |
| Dunvegan Church Of Scotland Manse | | | | 57°25′36″N 6°34′54″W | Category C(S) | 500 | Upload Photo |
| Sundial and Walled Garden, Dunvegan Castle | | | | 57°26′48″N 6°35′22″W | Category B | 504 | Upload another image |
| Neist Point Lighthouse | | | | 57°25′24″N 6°47′18″W | Category B | 465 | Upload another image See more images |
| Glendale Mill And Kiln (Now Museum) | | | | 57°26′59″N 6°43′21″W | Category A | 467 | Upload another image See more images |
| Greshornish House | | | | 57°29′55″N 6°26′19″W | Category C(S) | 469 | Upload Photo |
| Lonmore Free Church | | | | 57°25′33″N 6°33′15″W | Category B | 473 | Upload another image See more images |
| Stein Village, Stein Inn | | | | 57°30′55″N 6°34′20″W | Category C(S) | 6221 | Upload another image See more images |
| Stein, Lochbay House | | | | 57°31′01″N 6°34′34″W | Category C(S) | 477 | Upload Photo |
| Waternish House Steading, Entrance Arch And Flanking Walls | | | | 57°31′16″N 6°34′41″W | Category C(S) | 481 | Upload Photo |
| Dunvegan Castle Gatepiers | | | | 57°26′55″N 6°35′24″W | Category B | 502 | Upload Photo |
| Hallin, Waternish Parish Church (Church Of Scotland) | | | | 57°32′27″N 6°36′00″W | Category B | 470 | Upload another image |
| Hallin, Waternish Parish Manse And Steading | | | | 57°32′26″N 6°35′59″W | Category B | 471 | Upload Photo |
| Unish | | | | 57°35′54″N 6°37′21″W | Category B | 480 | Upload Photo |
| Husabost House, Walled Garden And Gatepiers | | | | 57°28′02″N 6°40′09″W | Category C(S) | 472 | Upload Photo |
| Dunvegan, Burnbank | | | | 57°25′56″N 6°34′24″W | Category C(S) | 497 | Upload Photo |
| Dunvegan Castle Stables And Saw Mill | | | | 57°27′08″N 6°35′33″W | Category B | 505 | Upload Photo |
| Dunvegan Pier | | | | 57°26′29″N 6°35′28″W | Category C(S) | 506 | Upload another image See more images |
| Glendale 5 Glasphien | | | | 57°27′11″N 6°42′07″W | Category B | 468 | Upload Photo |
| Dunvegan, St Mary's Old Church, Kilmuir | | | | 57°26′15″N 6°34′34″W | Category B | 499 | Upload Photo |
| Lonmore Free Church Manse | | | | 57°25′32″N 6°33′12″W | Category C(S) | 474 | Upload Photo |
| Former Free Church School And Schoolhouse, Lonmore | | | | 57°25′33″N 6°33′17″W | Category C(S) | 475 | Upload Photo |
| Uiginish Lodge Dovecot | | | | 57°26′26″N 6°35′51″W | Category C(S) | 479 | Upload Photo |

== Key ==
The scheme for classifying buildings in Scotland is:

- Category A: "buildings of national or international importance, either architectural or historic; or fine, little-altered examples of some particular period, style or building type."
- Category B: "buildings of regional or more than local importance; or major examples of some particular period, style or building type, which may have been altered."
- Category C: "buildings of local importance; lesser examples of any period, style, or building type, as originally constructed or moderately altered; and simple traditional buildings which group well with other listed buildings."

In March 2016 there were 47,288 listed buildings in Scotland. Of these, 8% were Category A, and 50% were Category B, with the remaining 42% being Category C.

== See also ==
- List of listed buildings in Highland
