= Rattray Head =

Headland in eastern Scotland, with a lighthouse

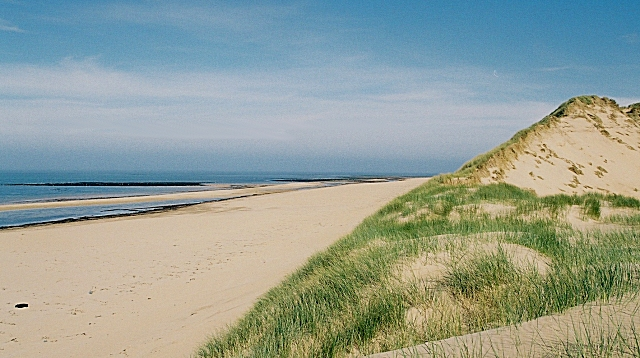
Looking south across the sand dunes at Rattray Head

Rattray Head, historically Rattray Point, is a headland in Buchan, Aberdeenshire, on the north-east coast Scotland. To north lies Strathbeg Bay and Rattray Bay is to its south. The dunes at Rattray Head beach can be up to 75 feet (23 m) high and stretch 17 miles (27 km) from St Combs to Peterhead.

== Rattray Head lighthouse ==
Rattray Head Lighthouse
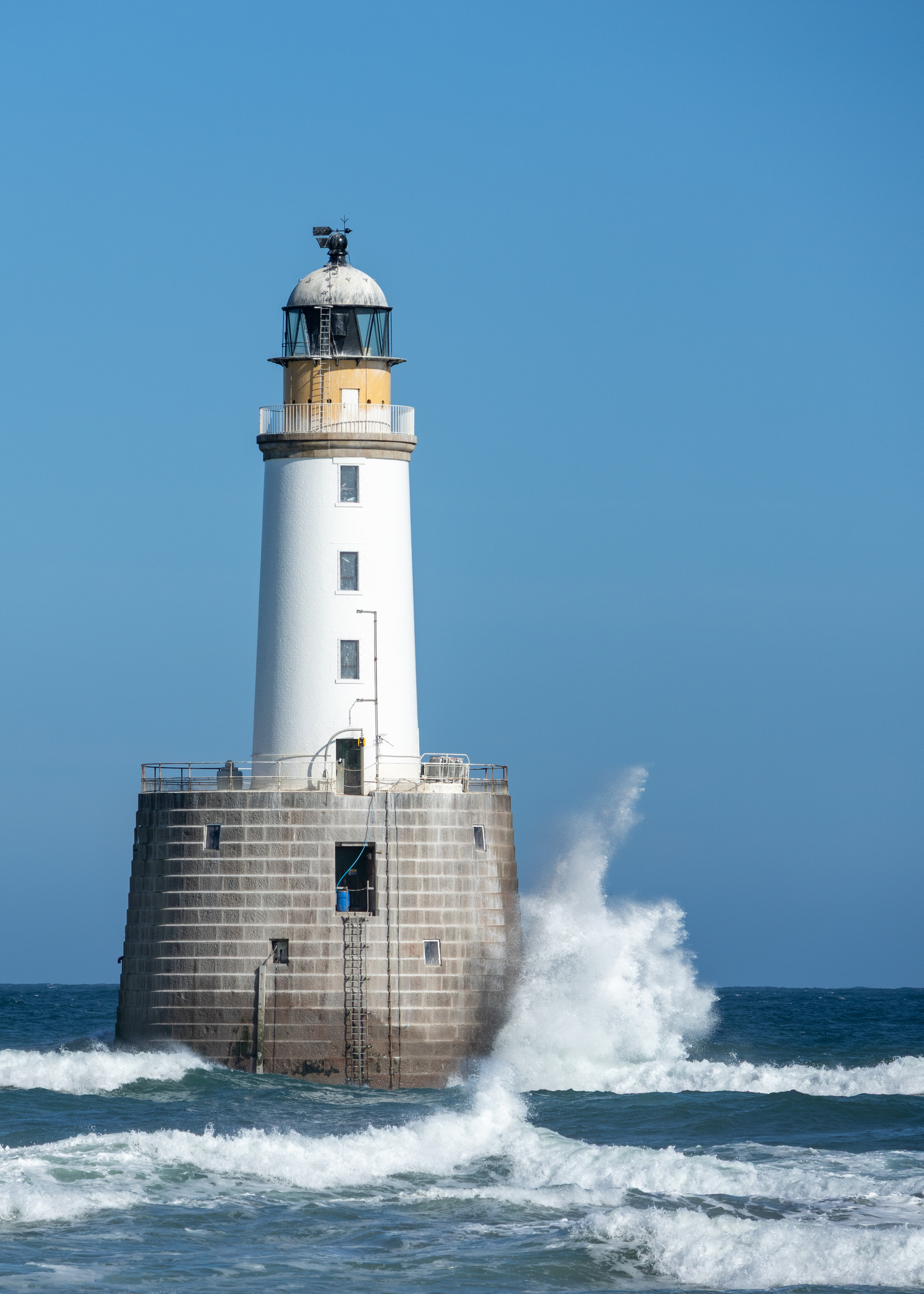
- Rattray Head Lighthouse
- Location: Rattray Head; Buchan; Aberdeenshire; Scotland
- OS grid: NK1106457807
- Coordinates: 57.610123°N 1.816557°W

Tower
- Constructed: 1895
- Built by: David Alan Stevenson, Charles Alexander Stevenson
- Foundation: granite basement
- Construction: brick tower
- Automated: 1982
- Height: 34 metres (112 ft)
- Shape: cylindrical tower with balcony and lantern on a conical frustum basement
- Markings: unpainted basement, white tower, black lantern
- Power source: solar power
- Operator: Rattray Head B&B and Ratty's Tearoom
- Heritage: category B listed building
- Fog signal: 2 blasts every 45s.

Light
- Focal height: 28 metres (92 ft)
- Intensity: 156,000 candela
- Range: 24 nautical miles (44 km; 28 mi)
- Characteristic: Fl (3) W 30s.

The 120-foot (37 m) Rattray Head lighthouse was built in 1895. It was built by the engineers and brothers David Alan Stevenson and Charles Alexander Stevenson. In February 1982 it became unmanned and self-working.

The lighthouse is accessible by way of a causeway that is usually underwater and only visible at low tide. It is wide enough for a vehicle to cross.

Remains of several shipwrecks can still be seen on the beach.

Access to the beach is by a narrow track with deep ruts, potholes and limited passing places which leads to a carpark and a short walk through the sand dunes (high ground clearance and good reversing skills required).

== See also ==
- List of lighthouses in Scotland
- List of Northern Lighthouse Board lighthouses
