= Eilean Musdile =

Island and lighthouse in the Inner Hebrides, Scotland

Lismore Lighthouse Eilean Musdile
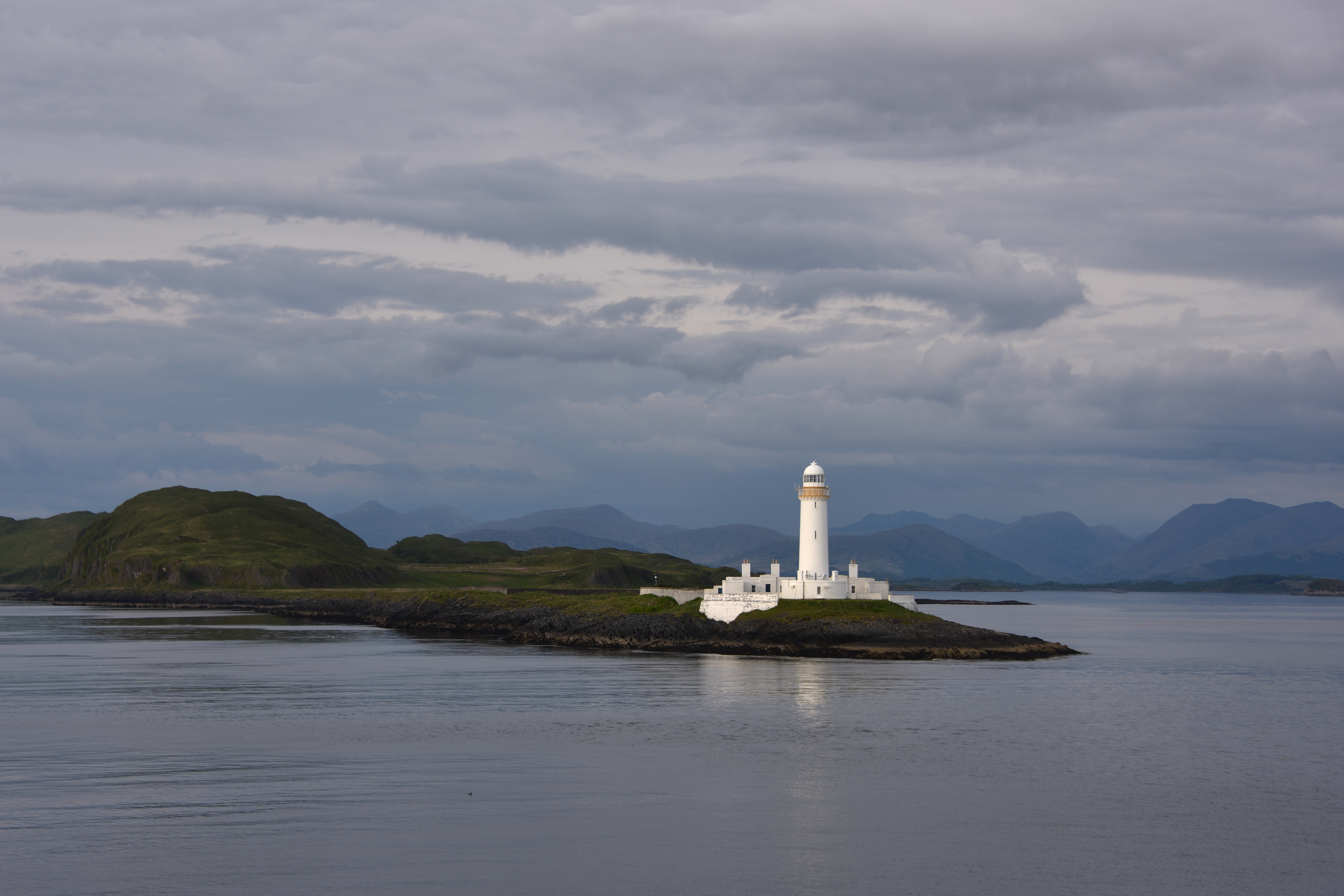
- The lighthouse on Eilean Musdile from the Oban to Craignure ferry.
- Location: Eilean Musdile; Firth of Lorn; Scotland
- OS grid: NM7781235105
- Coordinates: 56°27′20″N 5°36′27″W

Tower
- Constructed: 1833
- Designed by: Robert Stevenson
- Construction: masonry tower
- Automated: June 1965
- Height: 26 metres (85 ft)
- Shape: cylindrical tower with balcony and lantern attached to 1-storey keeper's house
- Markings: white tower and lantern, ochre trim
- Operator: Northern Lighthouse Board
- Heritage: category A listed building

Light
- Focal height: 31 metres (102 ft)
- Intensity: 71,000 candela
- Range: 17 miles (27 km)
- Characteristic: Fl W 10s.

Eilean Musdile (Mansedale) is an islet, and lighthouse to the south west of Lismore in the Inner Hebrides.

The island lies in the entrance to Loch Linnhe, separated from Lismore by a sound ¼ miles across. It is a low-lying rock, ten acres (4.0 hectares) in size, with some grass on it. CalMac ferries pass close to the island on their way from Oban to Mull.

The lighthouse was built by Robert Stevenson in 1833 at a cost of £4260 and initially showed a fixed white light. In 1910 most of the Northern Lighthouse Board's lights were changed to dioptric or Fresnel lenses but Lismore and Fidra, in the Firth of Forth, were left as the only remaining purely catoptric lights in the service.

A Standing Stone once stood on the highest point of the island (NM779351). The 9-foot (2.7 m) monolith appears to have recorded the midwinter sunset and is thought to have been removed during construction of the lighthouse.

The skerry of Lady's Rock lies a short distance to the south west.

== See also ==
- List of lighthouses in Scotland
- List of Northern Lighthouse Board lighthouses
