= Neist Point Lighthouse =

Lighthouse on the Isle of Skye in Scotland

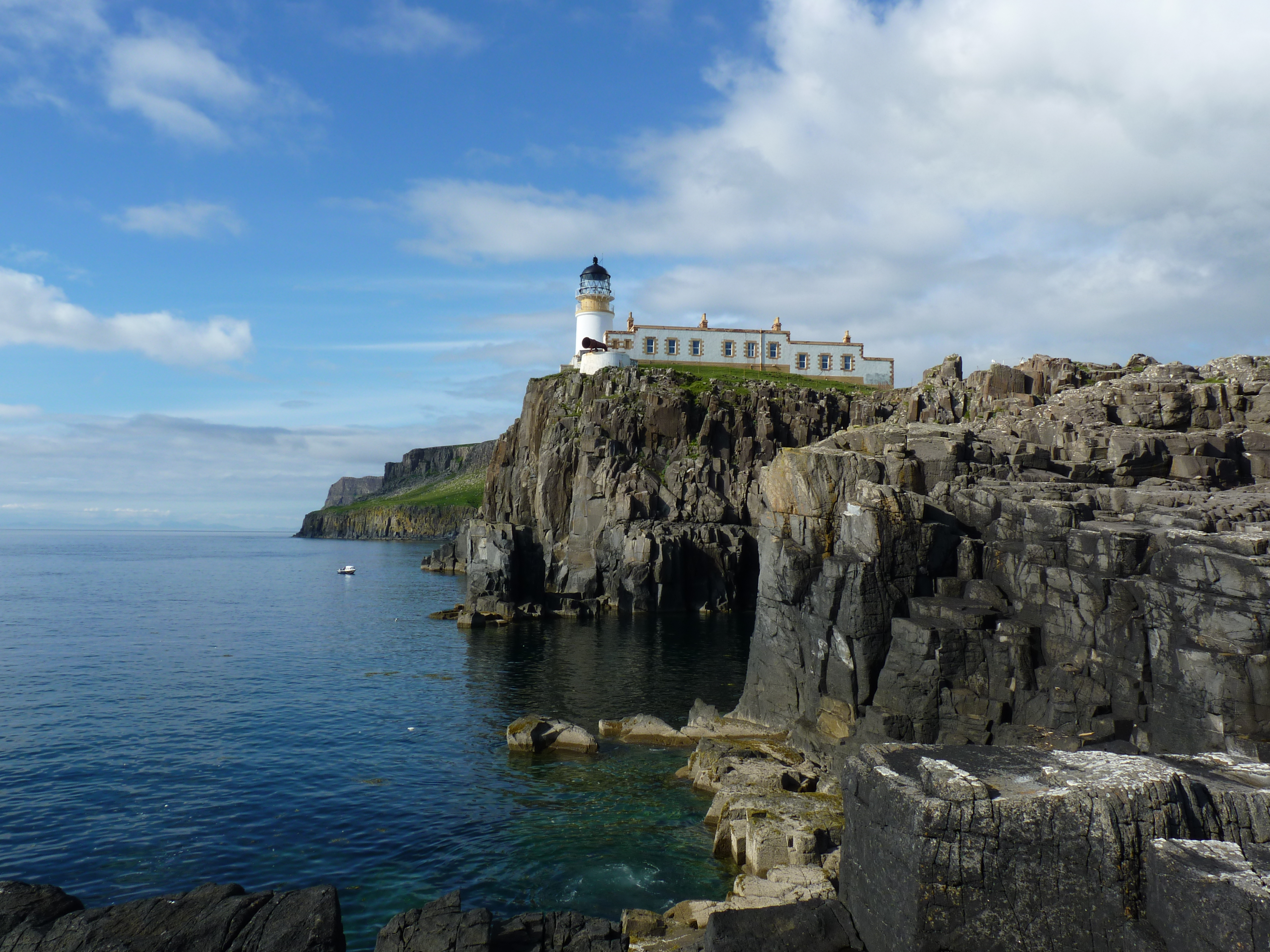
- Neist Point Lighthouse
- Location: Isle of Skye
- OS grid: NG1266547132
- Coordinates: 57°25′24.5″N 6°47′17.8″W

Tower
- Constructed: 1909
- Designed by: David Alan Stevenson
- Construction: masonry tower
- Automated: 1990
- Height: 19 metres (62 ft)
- Shape: cylindrical tower with balcony and lantern
- Markings: white tower, black lantern, ochre trim
- Operator: Northern Lighthouse Board
- Heritage: category B listed building

Light
- First lit: 1909
- Focal height: 43 metres (141 ft)
- Intensity: 480,000 candela
- Range: 16 nautical miles (30 km; 18 mi)
- Characteristic: Fl W 5s.

Neist Point Lighthouse is a lighthouse located on Neist Point on the Isle of Skye in Scotland. It was designed by David Alan Stevenson and was first lit on 1 November 1909. An aerial cableway was used to take supplies to the lighthouse and cottages.

Since 1990, the lighthouse has been operated remotely from the Northern Lighthouse Board headquarters in Edinburgh. The former keepers' cottages are now in private ownership.

In 1971 the lighthouse was listed as a Category B listed building.

== See also ==
- List of lighthouses in Scotland
- List of Northern Lighthouse Board lighthouses
