= Killantringan Lighthouse =

Historical lighthouse in south-west Scotland

Coordinates: 54.861834°N 5.146972°W

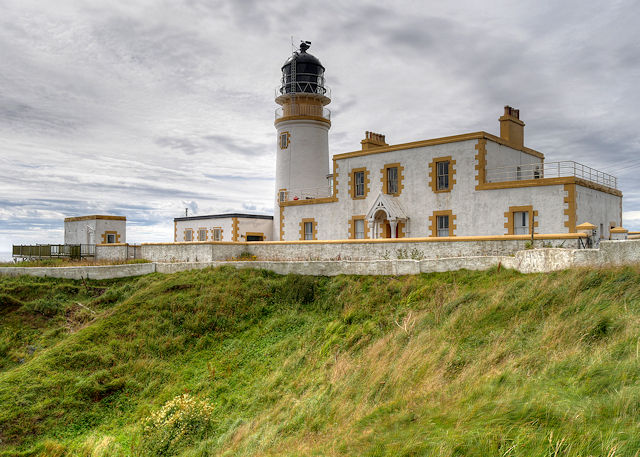
Killantringan Lighthouse in 2016

Killantringan Lighthouse is a lighthouse located near Portpatrick in Dumfries and Galloway, south-west Scotland. The light came into operation in 1900, and served as a waypoint in the North Channel of the Irish Sea. The name Killantringan is derived from Cill shaint Ringain, 'St Ringan's chapel'; Ringan is a mediaeval variation of Ninian. The lighthouse is protected as a category B listed building.

== History ==
Sanction for the Northern Lighthouse Board to build the lighthouse was granted in 1897. It was designed by David Alan Stevenson. The engineer's report specified a powerful fog signal was also required at the site. The lighthouse entered service on 1 October 1900. The light gave a flashing signal of two flashes in quick succession every 1/2 minute. When used, the fog signal was 3 blasts: low, low, high in quick succession every 1 1/2 minutes.

The light was automated in 1988, with the fog signal having been discontinued the previous year. Following a comprehensive review of services by the UK's three General Lighthouse Authorities in 2005, it was decided that Killantringan was surplus to requirements – serving primarily as a waypoint. The Lighthouse has been fully decommissioned, and along with the Lightkeepers House, is in private ownership

== See also ==
- List of lighthouses in Scotland
- List of Northern Lighthouse Board lighthouses
