= Cecil Curle =

Scottish archaeologist and art-historian

Cecil L. Curle FSA FSA Scot
- Born: Cecil Louisa Mowbray; 1901
- Died: 12 April 1987 (aged 85–86); Jedburgh

Academic work
- Discipline: Archaeology
- Sub-discipline: Scottish archaeology Early Christian archaeology

Cecil Louisa Curle FSA FSA Scot (1901 - 12 April 1987) was a Scottish archaeologist and art historian.

== Early life and education ==
Born Cecil Louisa Mowbray, she was first educated at home before studying history of art at the Glasgow College of Art, the Courtauld Institute in London, and the Sorbonne in Paris.

== Academic and Archaeological Work ==
During her time in France Cecil Curcle worked with Abbé Breuil to explore and record some of the cave paintings at Lascaux.

After returning to Scotland Cecil became interested in Scottish archaeology, with a particular focus on Early Christian art. She was elected as a Fellow of the Society of Antiquaries of Scotland in 1934, after which she excavated at Jarlshof and Wiltrow, as well as at the Ness of Burgi with A.O. Curle, on Shetland. In 1936-1937 she was employed by the Office of Works to supervise excavations at the Brough of Birsay..

Her interest in Early Christian Scotland and art-history led her to focus on researching incised and sculpted stones of this period, culminating with a seminal paper which was published in 1940, during the Second World War. As a result of her research, Curle (as she was now known) was elected as a Fellow of the Society of Antiquaries of London in 1943.

After the war, Alexander and Cecil, together with their daughter Christian, moved to Ethiopia where Lieutenant-Colonel Curle worked with the British Embassy in Addis Ababa. Cecil was then able to continue her studies into Early Christian Art, but also dedicate herself to some Ethiopian examples

In the 1970s and 1980s Curle dedicated herself to the publication of the artefacts recovered during the 1934 to 1974 excavations of the Brough of Birsay. At the age of 81 years old, she published a monograph on Birsay. She was the author of the first volume on the Brough of Birsay published in the Society of Antiquaries of Scotland Monograph series, on a summary of the Pictish and Norse finds from the site.

Cecil was also a great photographer, and in 1962 she published an illustrated volume on less known monuments in western Scotland.

Cecil Curle's impact on archaeology as a discipline was immense. She had connections with various archaeologists across the country and according to Rosemary Cramp, lecturer at Durham University, 'Cecil Curle...[was]...the person who first introduced our department to the archaeological wealth of Orkney', having had a volume dedicated to her memory.

== Personal life ==
Cecil married Alexander (Sandy) T. Curle in 1938 - he was the son of the archaeologist A.O. Curle. During the Second World War they briefly moved to Dorset.

== Select publications ==
- 1936. Mowbray, Cecil L. "Excavation at the Ness of Burgi, Shetland", Proceedings of the Society of Antiquaries of Scotland, 60 (1935–6), 381–7.
- 1940. Curle, Cecil L. "The chronology of the Early Christian monuments of Scotland", Proceedings of the Society of Antiquaries of Scotland, 74 (1939–40), 60–116.
- 1962. "Some little known Early Christian monuments in the West of Scotland", Proceedings of the Society of Antiquaries of Scotland, 95 (1961–2), 223–6.
- 1974. "An engraved lead disc from the Brough at Birsay, Orkney", Proceedings of the Society of Antiquaries of Scotland, 105 (1972–4), 301–7.
- 1982. "Pictish and Norse Finds from the Brough of Birsay 1934-74". (Society of Antiquaries of Scotland Monograph Series 1). Edinburgh.
- 1983. "The finds from the Brough of Birsay 1934-1974", Orkney Heritage, 2 (1983), 67–81.
