= Brough of Birsay Lighthouse =

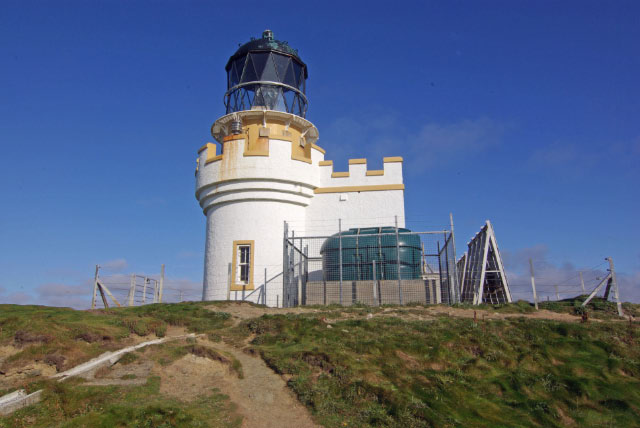
- Location: Brough of Birsay; Orkney; Scotland
- Coordinates: 59°08′13″N 3°20′21″W

Tower
- Constructed: 1925
- Built by: David Alan Stevenson
- Construction: masonry tower
- Height: 11 metres (36 ft)
- Shape: cylindrical tower with castellated balcony and lantern attached to service building
- Markings: white tower, black lantern, ochre trim
- Power source: solar power
- Operator: Northern Lighthouse Board

Light
- Focal height: 52 metres (171 ft)
- Intensity: 35 watt metal Halide light
- Range: 18 nautical miles (33 km; 21 mi)
- Characteristic: Fl(3) W 25s

The unmanned Brough of Birsay Lighthouse lighthouse was built in 1925 by David A Stevenson. It is located on the Brough of Birsay, an uninhabited tidal island off the northwest coast of Mainland in Orkney, Scotland, in the parish of Birsay. The island can be reached on foot by a causeway when the tide is low. The lighthouse, originally gas-powered, was converted to solar power in 2002.

== See also ==
- List of lighthouses in Scotland
- List of Northern Lighthouse Board lighthouses
