= Glencallum Bay Lighthouse =

Lighthouse in Argyll and Bute, Scotland

Coordinates: 55°43′48″N 5°00′14″W

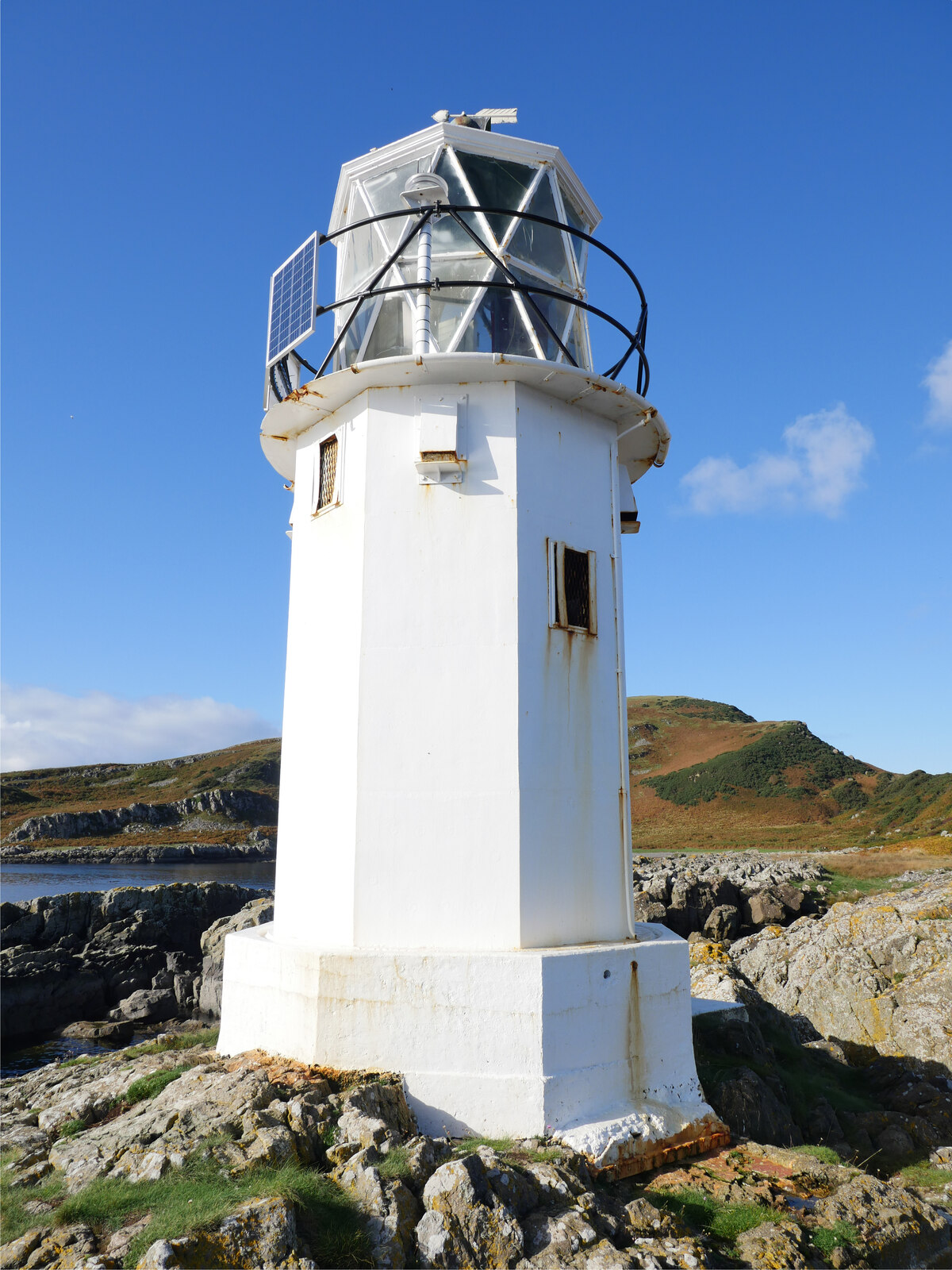

Glencallum Bay Lighthouse is a lighthouse on a point on the northernmost side of Glencallum Bay on the Isle of Bute. Its Gaelic name is the Rubh' An Eun which means the point of the birds.

The lighthouse was built in 1911 by the Stevenson family business which built many of the lighthouses in Scotland.

It is on the West Island Way.
