= D. E. Stevenson =

Scottish author (1892–1973)

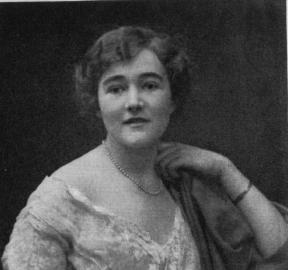
- in 1916
- Born: Dorothy Emily Stevenson; 18 November 1892; Edinburgh, Scotland
- Died: 30 December 1973 (aged 81); Moffat, Dumfries and Galloway, Scotland
- Education: governesses
- Occupation: novelist
- Known for: 45 novels
- Spouse: James Reid Peploe
- Parent(s): David Alan Stevenson; Annie Roberts

Dorothy Emily Stevenson (18 November 1892 – 30 December 1973) was a best-selling Scottish writer. She published more than 40 "light romantic novels" over a span of more than 40 years.

== Life ==
Stevenson was born in Melville Street, Edinburgh, Scotland, on 18 November 1892. Her father was David Alan Stevenson, a lighthouse engineer and first cousin to author Robert Louis Stevenson and her mother was Annie Roberts. A commemorative plaque marking the house where she spent her childhood was mounted at 14 Eglinton Crescent, Edinburgh in 2016. She began writing at a young age but hid her efforts because her parents and governesses disapproved. Her father refused to send her to university, lest she become a bluestocking.

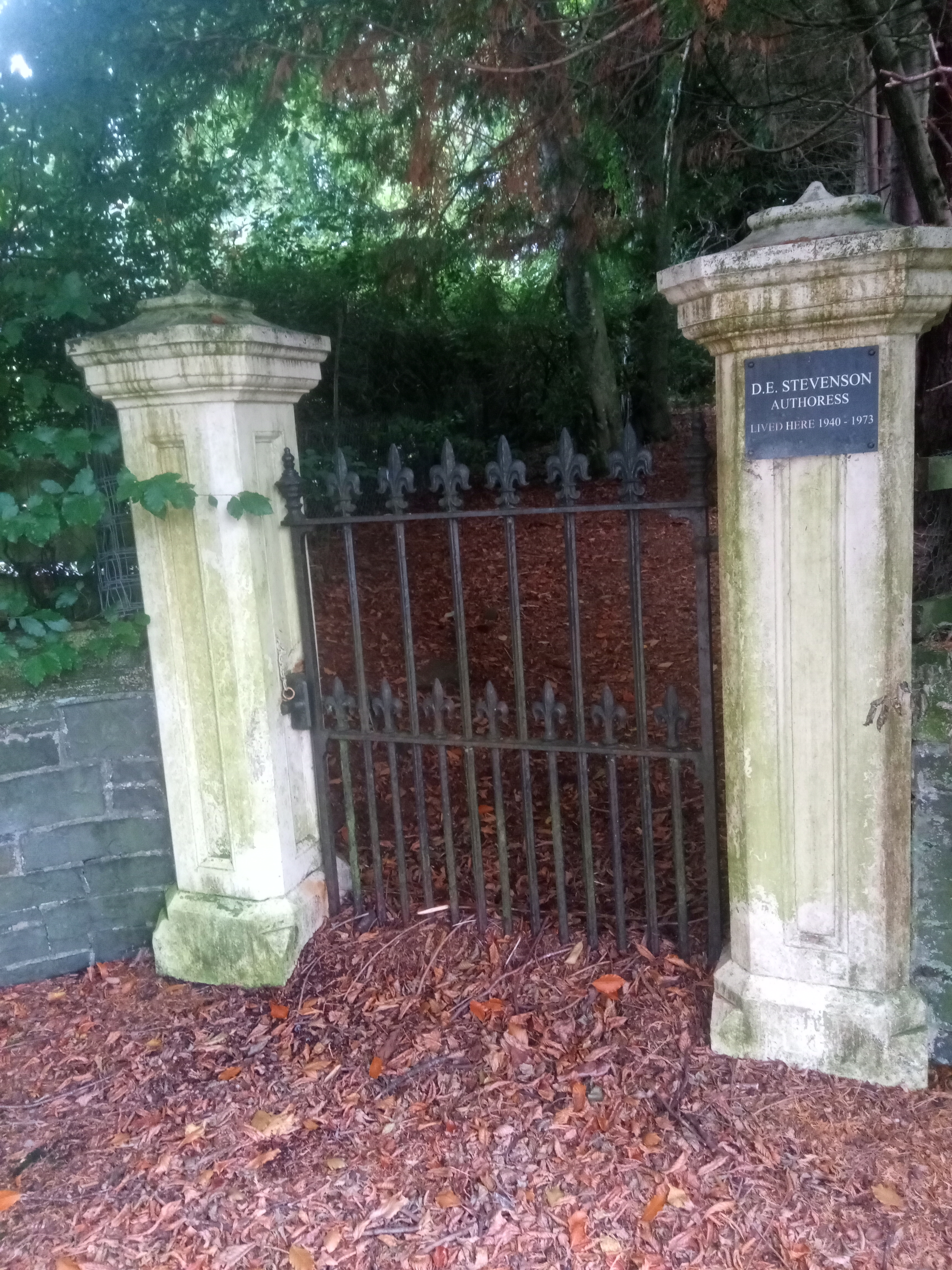
She lived at a house named "North Park" in Moffat from 1940 to her death

In 1916, Stevenson married James Reid Peploe, a captain in the 6th Gurkha Rifles. The Peploes had four children. Her 1932 novel Mrs. Tim of the Regiment, which describes her life as a British army wife, was based on her personal diary.

She wrote most of her books while living in the town of Moffat, Dumfries and Galloway, Scotland. Her novels were best-sellers, with more than seven million copies printed and translations in multiple languages. Her last book was published in 1969.

Stevenson died in Edinburgh in 1973. She is buried with her husband in Moffat New Cemetery.

== Legacy ==
In 2017, Historic Environment Scotland awarded a plaque to commemorate Stevenson, at 14 Eglinton Crescent, Edinburgh.

== Bibliography ==
Stevenson published under the name "DE Stevenson" or "D.E. Stevenson."

=== Poetry ===
Stevenson published three volumes of poetry, two of them before her novels.

- Meadow-flowers, 1915
- The Starry Mantle, 1926
- Alister and Co., 1940, 1943 (alternate title: It's Nice to Be Me)

=== Novels ===
==== Stand-alone novels ====
- Peter West, 1923 (first published in serial format in Chambers's Edinburgh Journal)
- Divorced From Reality, 1935 (alternate title: Miss Dean's Dilemma; republished in 1966 as The Young Clementina)
- Smouldering Fire, 1935
- The Empty World: A Romance of the Future, 1936 (alternate title: A World in Spell)
- The Story of Rosabelle Shaw, 1937 (alternate title: Rosabelle Shaw)
- Miss Bun the Baker's Daughter, 1938 (alternate title: The Baker's Daughter)
- Green Money, 1939
- Rochester's Wife, 1940
- The English Air, 1940
- Spring Magic, 1942
- Crooked Adam, 1942 in US, 1969 in UK
- Celia's House, 1943
- Listening Valley, 1944
- Kate Hardy, 1947
- Young Mrs. Savage, 1948
- Five Windows, 1953
- Charlotte Fairlie, 1954 (alternate titles: Blow the Wind Southerly, The Enchanted Isle)
- The Tall Stranger, 1957
- Anna and her Daughters, 1958
- Still Glides the Stream, 1959
- The Musgraves, 1960
- The Blue Sapphire, 1963
- The House on the Cliff, 1966

==== Mrs. Tim Christie ====
- Mrs Tim of the Regiment, 1932 (alternate title: Mrs. Tim of the Regiment, or, Leaves from the Diary of an Officer's Wife)
- Golden Days, 1934 (alternate title: Golden Days: Further Leaves from Mrs. Tim's Journal)
- Mrs Tim Carries On, 1941
- Mrs. Tim Gets a Job, 1947
- Mrs. Tim Flies Home, 1952

Note that Mrs Tim of the Regiment and Golden Days were originally published separately, but all subsequent reprints combined the two halves into a single volume titled Mrs. Tim Christie.

==== Miss Buncle ====
- Miss Buncle's Book, 1934 (republished in 2008 by Persephone Books)
- Miss Buncle Married, 1936 (republished in 2011 by Persephone Books)
- The Two Mrs. Abbotts, 1943 (republished in 2013 by Persephone Books)
- The Four Graces, 1946

==== Vittoria Cottage trilogy ====
- Vittoria Cottage, 1949
- Music in The Hills, 1950
- Winter and Rough Weather, 1951 (alternate title: Shoulder the Sky)

==== Other series ====
Amberwell

- Amberwell, 1955
- Summerhills, 1956

Bel Lamington

- Bel Lamington, 1961
- Fletcher's End, 1962

Katherine Wentworth

- Katherine Wentworth, 1964
- Katherine's Marriage, 1965 (alternate title: The Marriage of Katherine)

Sarah Morris Remembers

- Sarah Morris Remembers, 1967
- Sarah's Cottage, 1968

Gerald and Elizabeth

- Gerald and Elizabeth, 1969
- House of the Deer, 1970

=== Posthumously published works ===
Five additional works were published by Greyladies after being discovered in a box in the Stevenson family attic.

- Jean Erskine's Secret, written 1913–1917, published 2013
- Emily Dennistoun, written 1920s, published 2011
- Portrait of Saskia, written 1920s, published 2011
- The Fair Miss Fortune, written 1930s, published 2011
- Found in the Attic, collection of papers, published 2013

== Inter-book links ==
Some of Stevenson's characters appear as supporting characters or make cameo appearances in her other novels. She also sometimes reused settings.

Miss Buncle spills into The Four Graces as well as Spring Magic, and her book is described in Anna and her Daughters. Celia's House inspired Listening Valley, where Celia makes a re-appearance. Readers hear of her again during Anna and Her Daughters. Anna pops up briefly in the Katherine books which link with Charlotte Fairlie (Mr. Heath the vicar makes a re-appearance this time). Later Sarah Morris ends up in Ryddelton in Sarah's Cottage to be befriended by Debbie (who made her debut in Celia's House) and to hear about Tonia (Listening Valley) and Charlotte Fairlie.

More links exist from the Katherine books, via Mr Sandford the lawyer, to House on the Cliff which links via Miss Martineau the landlady to The Blue Sapphire. The Katherine books also tell readers more about MacAslan who is first introduced in Smouldering Fire. Stevenson's last book, The House of the Deer (a reworking of a serial published in The Glasgow Bulletin in 1936) revisits the MacAslan family in the second generation, and is a sequel to Gerald and Elizabeth.

Gerald and Elizabeth enter into the saga around Drumburly and re-introduce Freda from Five Windows. Jock from the Music in the Hills trilogy also knows of Freda. Bel Lamington links into these books. Bel's friend Margaret was a Musgrave, and there are links from The Musgraves to The Tall Stranger, which was a sequel (of sorts) to Five Windows (though Stevenson, uncharacteristically, makes an error between the two books - in Five Windows the main character is David Kirke while in The Tall Stranger his name is spelled Kirk). The Musgraves give a tenuous link back to Ryddelton via "The Mulberry Coach", a story written by one of Anna's daughters and nearly performed by Delia Musgrave.

The Amberwell books link closely to Still Glides the Stream which in turn ties in with the Sarah books, in that Will and Sarah both visit Nivennes and meet with the Delormes family, although their visits are many years apart.

Another recurring character is the author Janetta Walters, whose light romantic novels are either loved or loathed by Stevenson characters. Her books in are mentioned in Mrs. Tim Carries On and Spring Magic. She appears in person in The Two Mrs. Abbotts and The Four Graces.

Dr. (Monkey) Wrench appears briefly in Vittoria Cottage to deliver the Widgeons' baby. He was introduced as Arthur's close friend and war buddy in Miss Buncle Married. He continued to appear in The Two Mrs. Abbotts where he had the added and interesting role of the bonfire builder.

== Republication ==
Many of Stevenson's more popular books have been reissued.

Persephone Books reprinted Miss Buncle's Book in 2008 and Miss Buncle Married in 2011, followed by Miss Buncle Married and The Two Mrs Abbotts. Mrs. Tim of the Regiment was reprinted by Bloomsbury in 2010. Sourcebooks Landmark released the first two Miss Buncle books in the U.S. in 2012, followed in 2013 by The Young Clementina and The Two Mrs. Abbotts. Endeavour Media has republished many of D.E Stevenson's titles in eBook format, and Dean Street Press have issued many as paperbacks.

== See also ==
Please Turn Over, (1959)
