= Waternish Point =

Waternish or Vaternish Point (Scottish Gaelic Rubha Bhatairnis) is the northwestern promontory of the Waternish peninsula on Skye. Its chief feature is the steep cliff above a rocky beach. Above the cliff grassy terrain rises gently to the abandoned settlement of Unish, now only ruins. The grassland over the point is considered part of the point. It was once farmed from Unish.

Waternish Point has housed the Vaternish Lighthouse since 1924.

== Geography ==
Vaternish Point is a rugged, uncultivated high promontory.
