= Brough of Birsay =

Tidal island off The Mainland of Orkney, Scotland

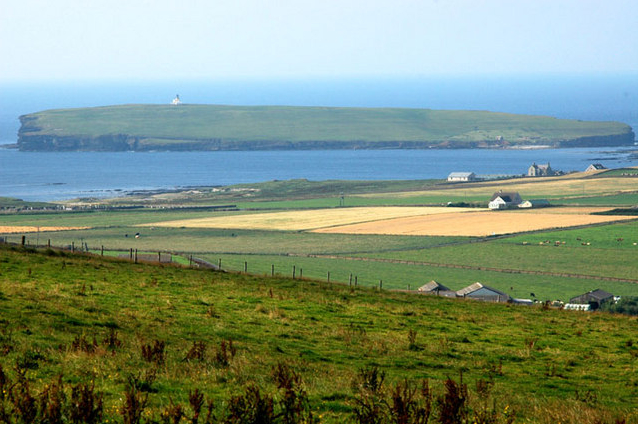

Location
- Brough of Birsay shown within the Orkney Islands
- OS grid reference: HY236285
- Coordinates: 59°08′13″N 3°20′07″W

Name
- Name meaning: fort island
- Old Norse name: Byrgisey

Physical geography
- Island group: Orkney
- Area: 16 ha
- Highest elevation: 46 metres (151 feet)

Administration
- Council area: Orkney Islands
- Country: Scotland
- Sovereign state: United Kingdom

Demographics
- Population: 0

The Brough of Birsay is an uninhabited tidal island off the north-west coast of The Mainland of Orkney, Scotland, in the parish of Birsay. It is located around 13 nautical miles (24 kilometres) north of Stromness and features the remains of Pictish and Norse settlements as well as a modern lighthouse.

== Geography and geology ==
The island is accessible on foot at low tide via a largely natural causeway. It is separated from the mainland by a 240-metre (790-foot) stretch of water at high tide: the Sound of Birsay.

The Norse settlement has been partly removed by coastal erosion, and the cliffs are reinforced by concrete rip-rap to prevent further damage.

== Etymology ==
The Old Norse name for the island was "Byrgisey" which means fort island, and gives the parish its name. Brough, indeed, means fort (for etymology, see broch).

== History ==
=== Earliest settlement of Christians and Picts ===
The earliest settlement on the island is thought to have been in the 6th century, perhaps by Christian missionaries. In the 7th and 8th centuries it was a significant Pictish fortress, but by the 9th century the Picts had been displaced by Norsemen.

Excavations were first undertaken by Cecil Curle in 1936–1937.

The Pictish settlement is attested by a small well and an important collection of artefacts (now in The Orkney Museum (formerly known as Tankerness House Museum), Kirkwall and in the Museum of Scotland, Edinburgh). Notable among these are a group of moulds for fine metalworking, showing that bronze brooches and other ornaments were being manufactured on the site in the 8th century. The enclosure round the Norse church overlies a Pictish graveyard, and an important Pictish carved stone was found in pieces in this enclosure during site clearance (also on display in Edinburgh: replica on site). The most interesting Pictish artefact found is a stone slab showing three figures and some additional Pictish symbols. It is not known what the subject of this carving is, but it likely shows aristocratic Picts as they wished to be perceived. This early 8th-century slab shows a striking procession of three Picts dressed in long robes and bearing spears, swords and square shields. Above the figures are parts of four Pictish symbols. Two simple cross-incised slabs, likely grave-markers, were also found in the graveyard, and are probably Pictish or early medieval in date (displayed on site).

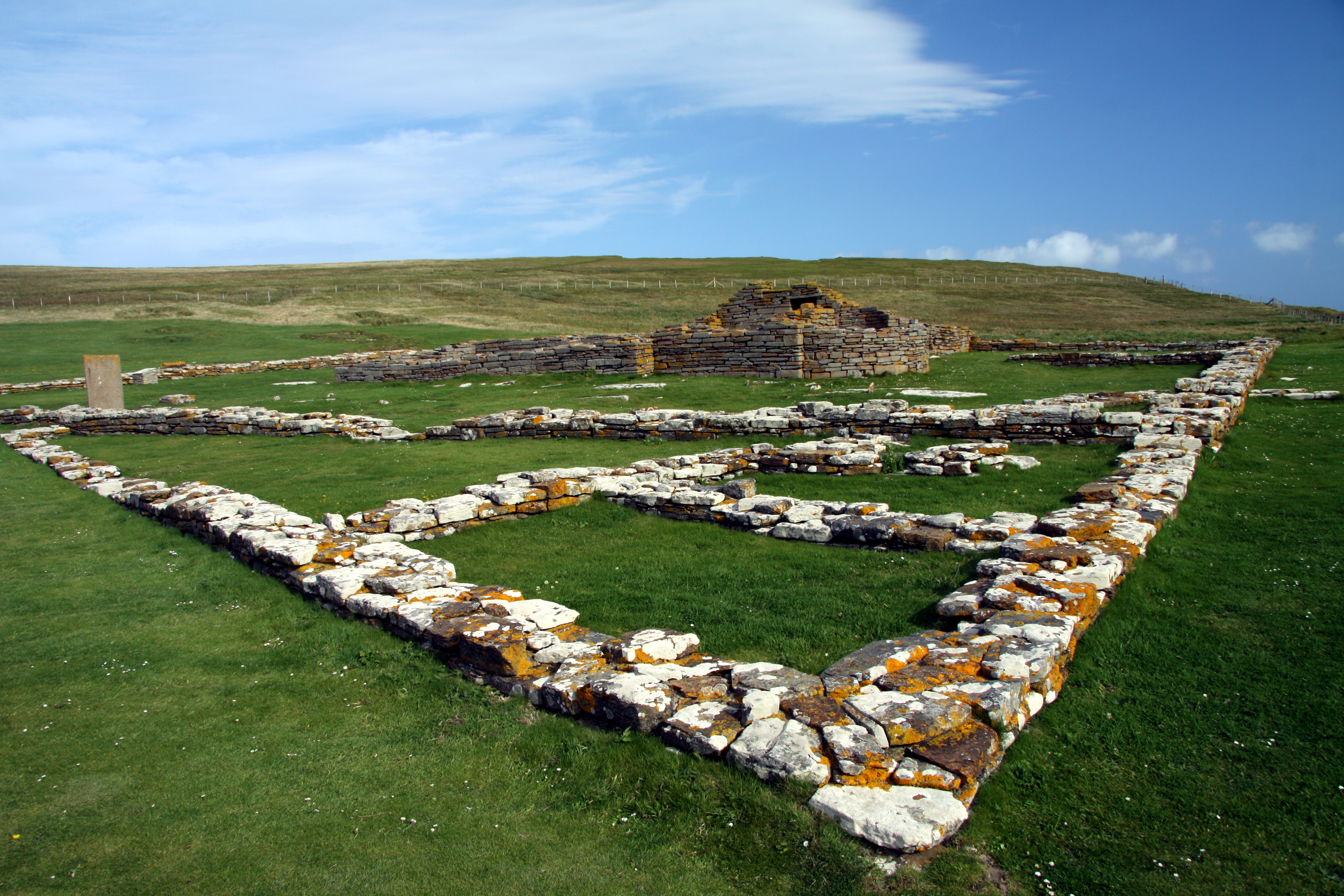
The remains of houses with the church and, on the left, the replica Pictish stone

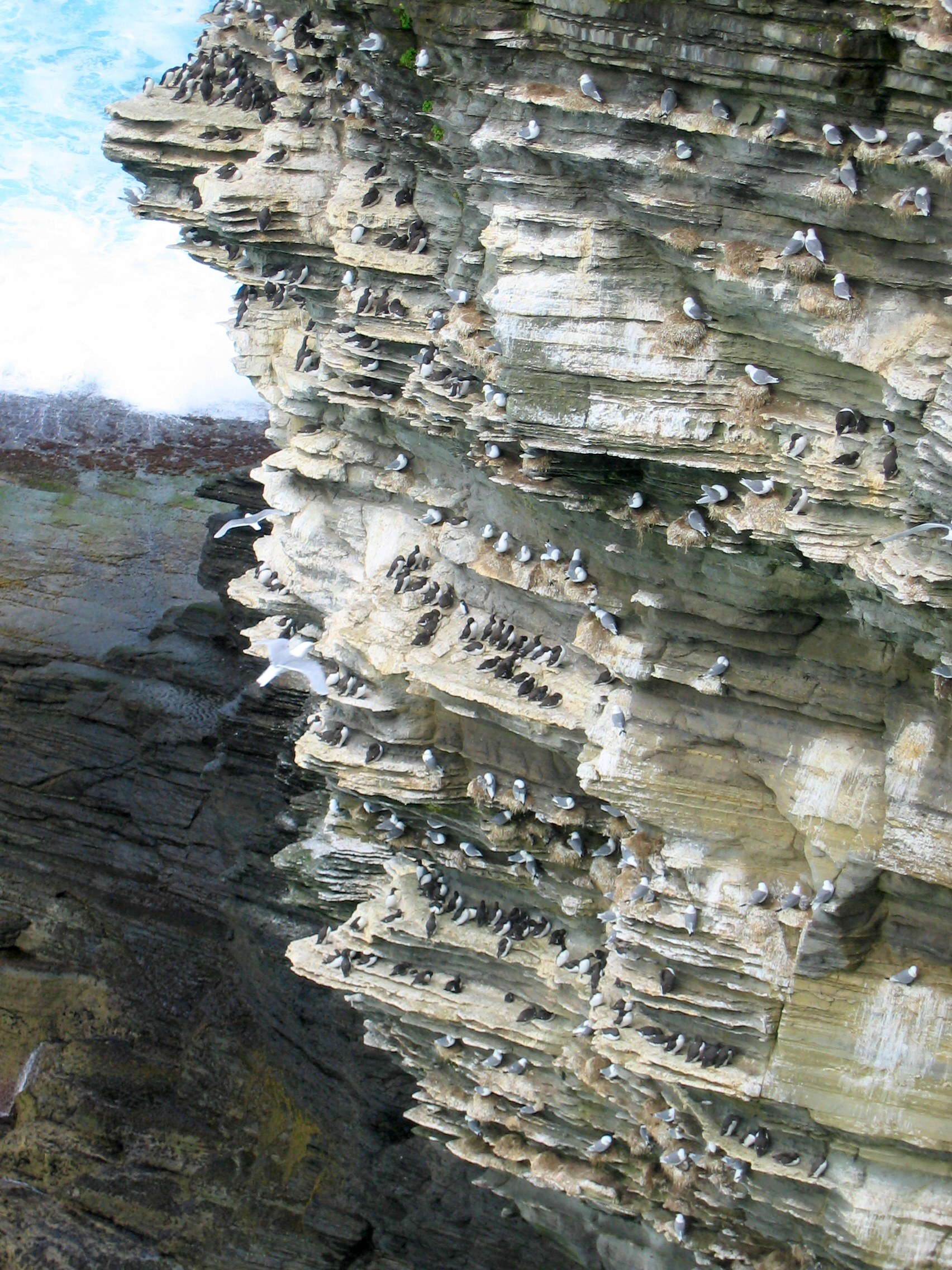
Breeding colony of fulmar (Fulmarus glacialis) and guillemot (Uria aalge) on the Brough of Birsay

=== Norse settlement and St Peter's chapel ===
The extensive remains of an excavated Norse settlement and church overlay the earlier Pictish settlement. Before Kirkwall became the centre of power in the 12th century, Birsay was the seat of the rulers of Orkney.

According to the Orkneyinga saga the main residence of the Earl of Orkney, Thorfinn the Mighty (1014–1065), was located in Birsay. At this time the first Bishop of Orkney was appointed and his cathedral, known as "Christchurch," which later housed the remains of St Magnus, probably on the site of the present day St Magnus Kirk, nearby on the Mainland. It was once thought that Earl/Jarl Thorfinn's hall could have been located on the brough but it is today thought to have been nearby on the Mainland.

Today, many of the remains of the settlement are visible. The most significant being the remains of a fine, though small Romanesque church. This dates back to the 12th century and was dedicated to St Peter. The church has a semi-circular apse and there are the remains of stone benches for the congregation lining the walls. The red sandstone altar was reconstructed in the 1930s. An enclosure wall surrounding the kirk separated the graveyard from the houses beyond.

The church has an interesting shape; probably with a square tower at one end, and a semi-circular apse at the other. There is some evidence of an earlier, possibly Pictish church on the same site. The church was a place of pilgrimage until the Middle Ages. The remains of adjoining buildings round three sides of an open court suggest that it may once have been a small monastery (though there is no documentation for such a foundation).

There were also a number of Norse dwellings, some of them of considerable size indicating substantial wealth. They included longhouses, featuring both heating and drainage systems and some indications that saunas were present. Although not all the houses were likely in use at the same time, there was a significant community living here. The site, and particularly the objects found there, have been central to debates about the nature of Pictish-Norse relations in Northern Scotland.

The site is in the care of Historic Environment Scotland.

== Lighthouse ==
The unmanned Brough of Birsay Lighthouse is on the Brough.

== Flora and fauna ==
Sea bird breeding colonies can be found on the brough.

== Gallery ==
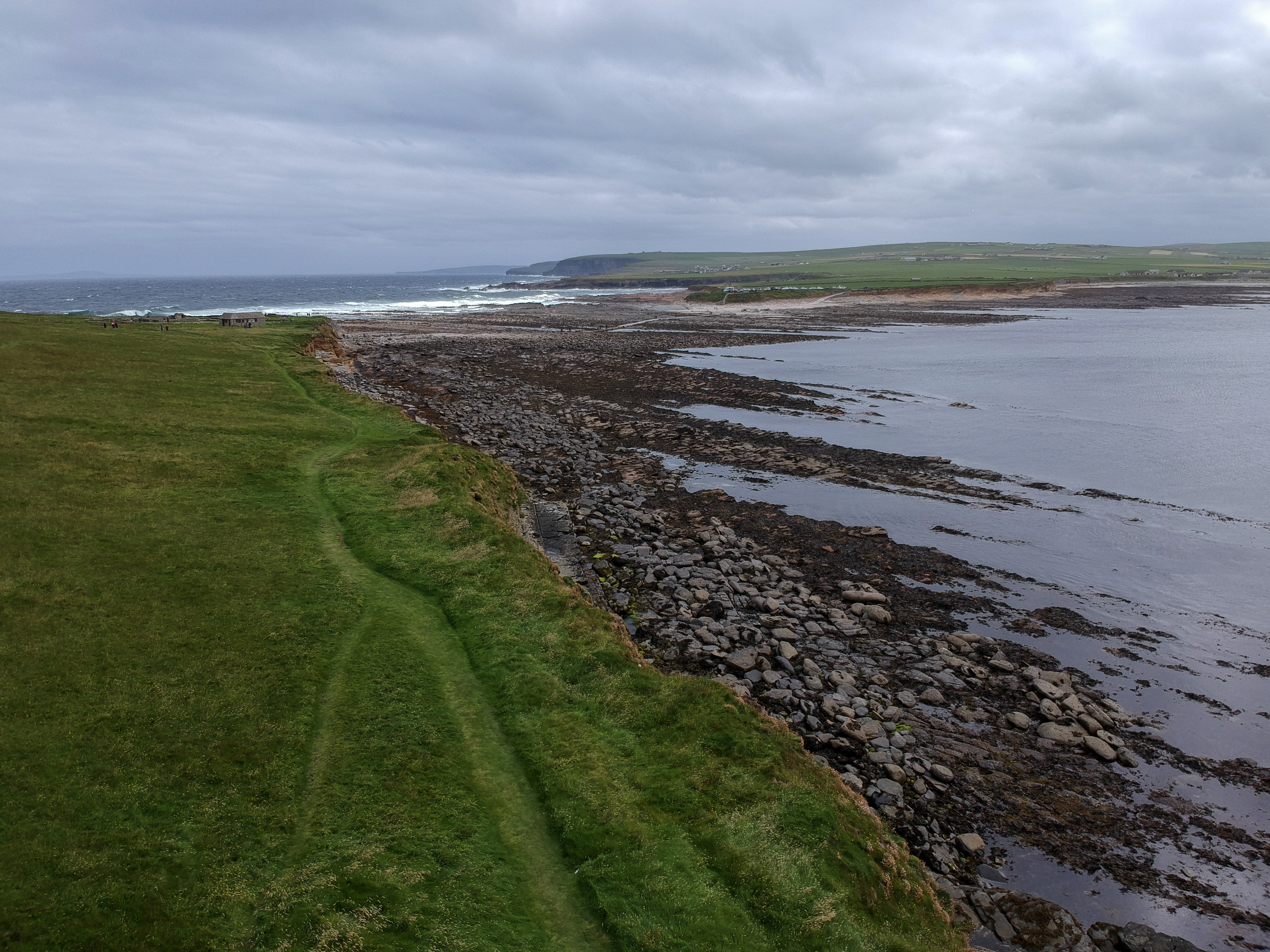
View to the causeway over the Birsay Sound

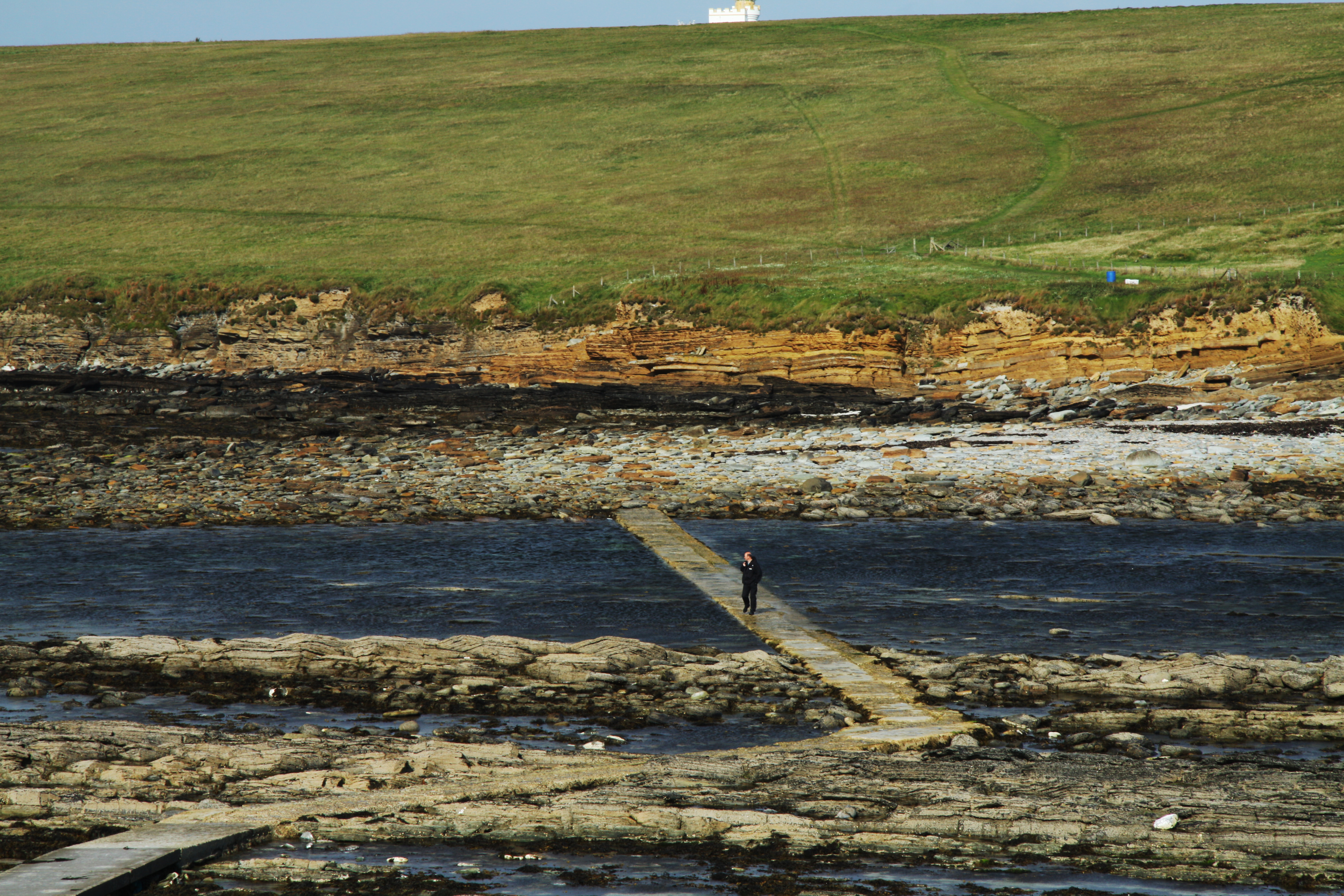
The island is connected with Mainland by a concrete pathway

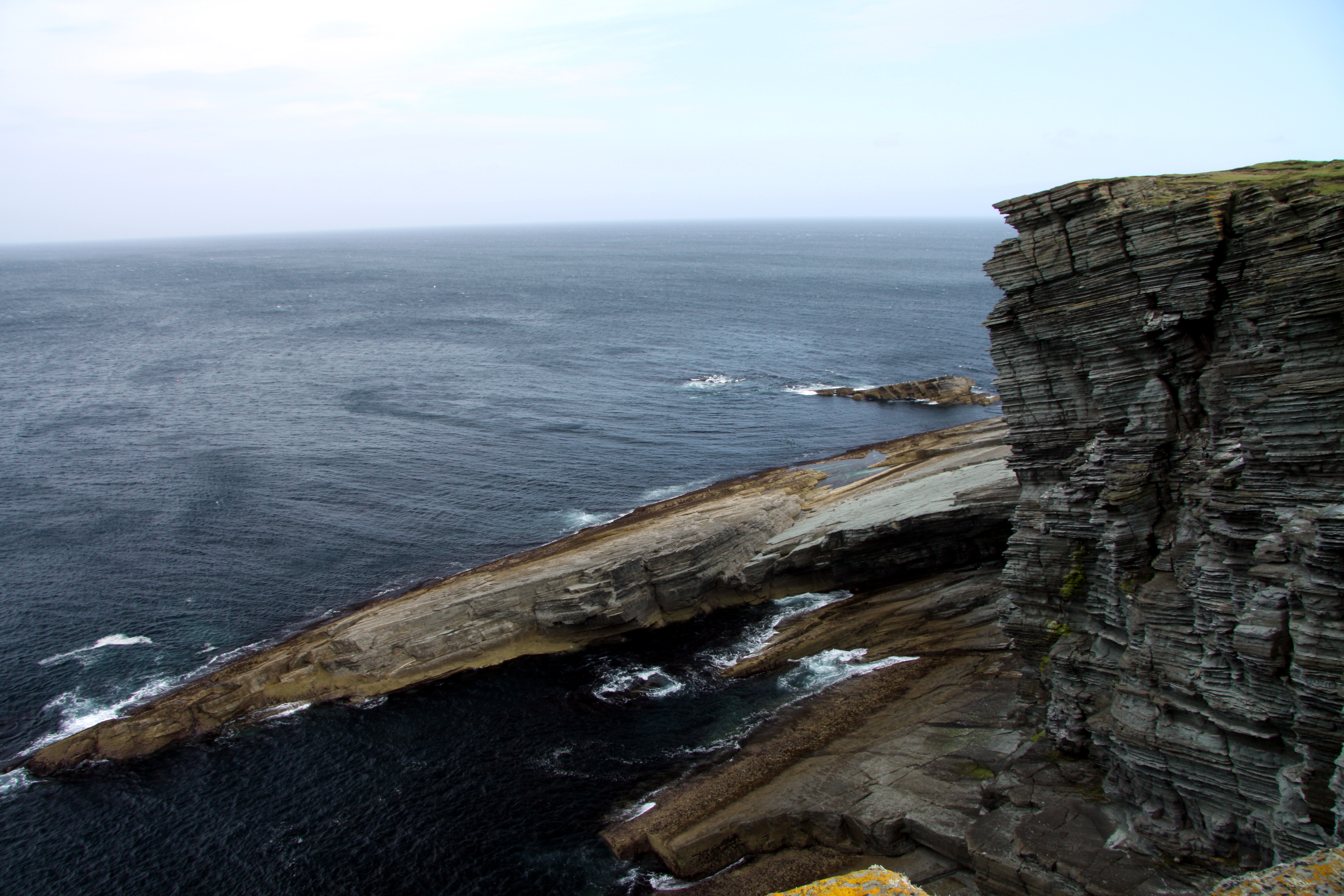
Cliffs

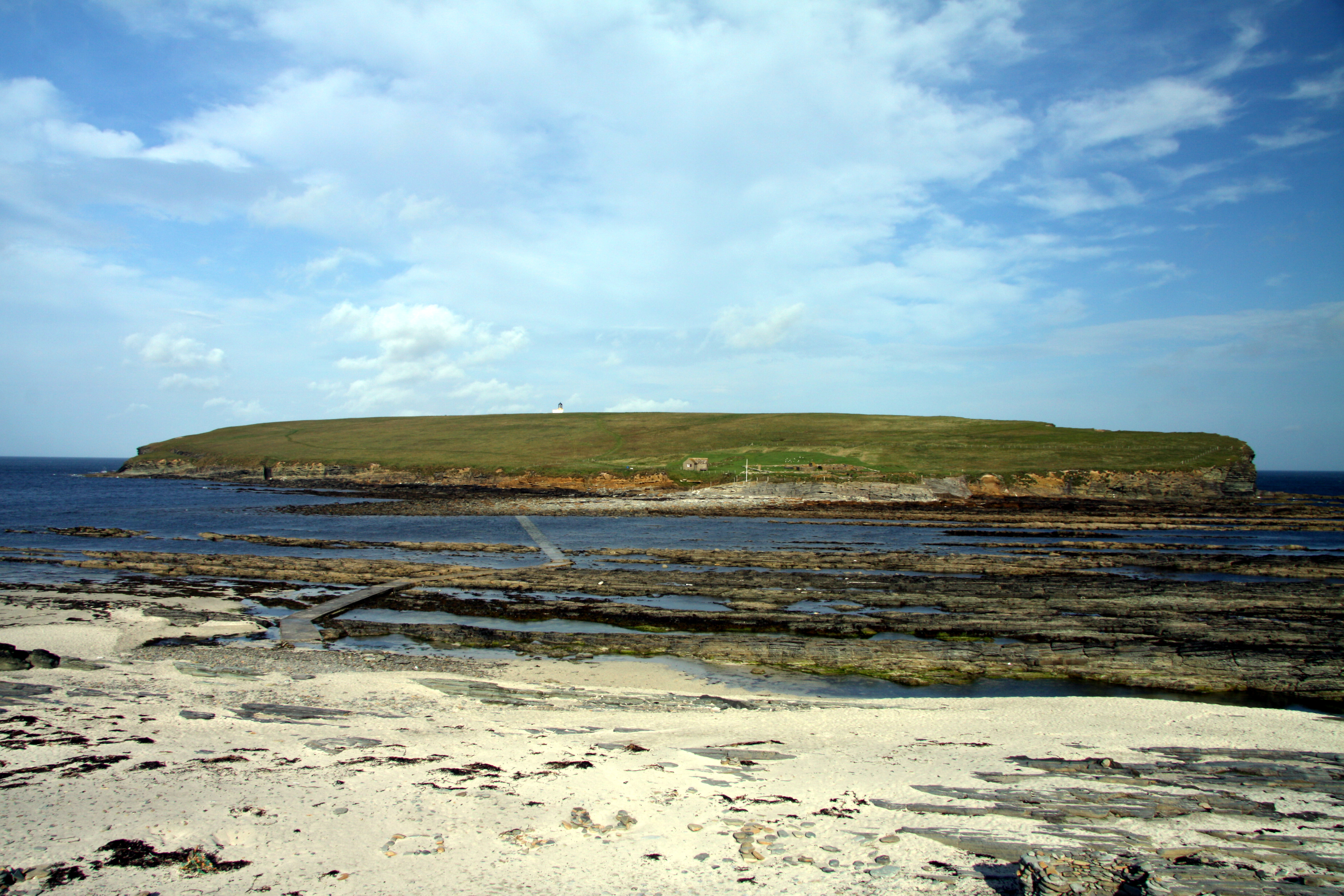
View of the whole island

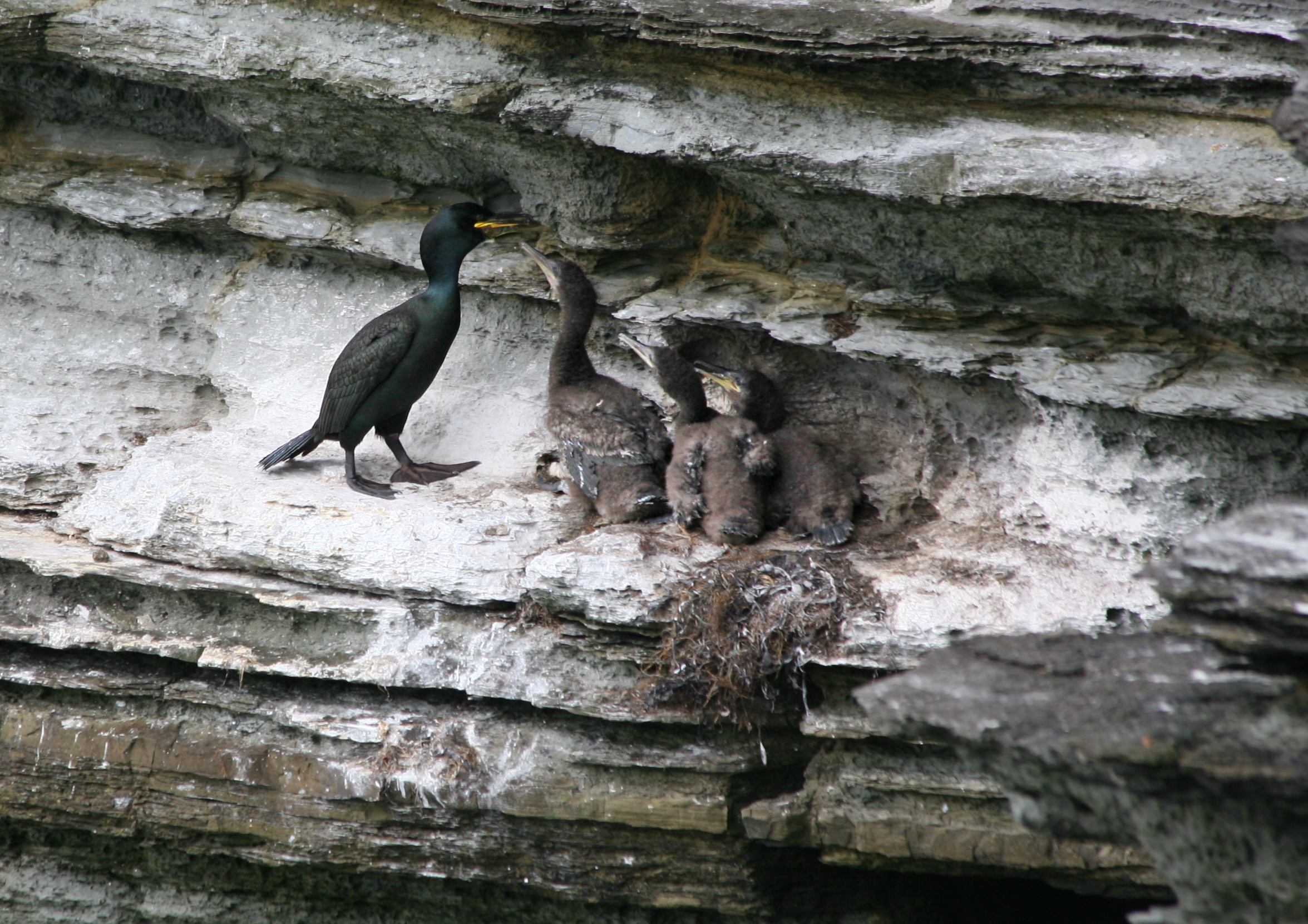
Cormorant rearing young on the cliff ledges

== See also ==
- Broch of Gurness
- List of islands of Scotland
- List of Orkney islands
