= Neist Point =

Viewpoint on Skye, Scotland

Coordinates: 57.421°N 6.787°W

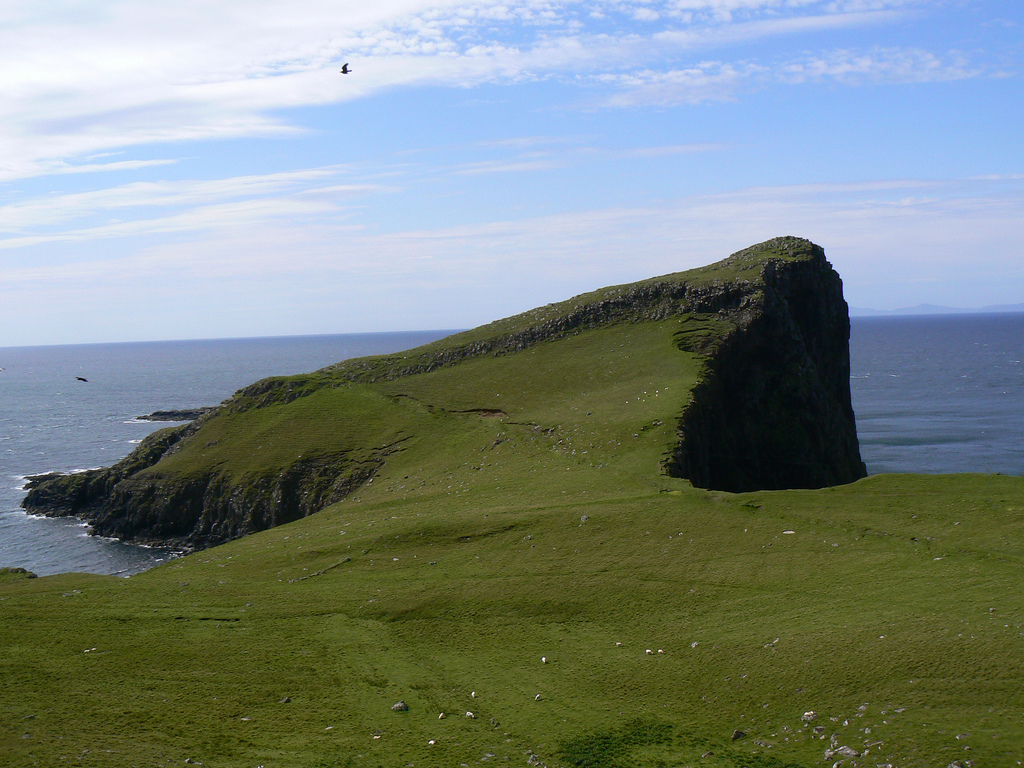
Neist Point

Neist Point (Scottish Gaelic: Rubha na h-Eist) is a viewpoint on the most westerly point of Skye. Neist Point Lighthouse has been located there since 1909.

== Geography ==
Neist Point is the most westerly point on the Duirinish peninsula on the Isle of Skye. It projects into The Minch and provides a walk and viewpoint.

== Natural history ==
Basalt at Neist Point is very similar to that at the Giant's Causeway in Northern Ireland. A steep path leads down from the road. Whales, dolphins, porpoises and basking shark can be seen from the point. Common seabirds include gannets, black guillemots, razorbills and European shags. Several rare plants, including saxifrages are found on the point.
