= David Alan Stevenson =

Scottish lighthouse engineer

David Alan Stevenson FRSE MIMechE FRSSA MICE
- Born: 21 July 1854
- Died: 11 April 1938 (aged 83)
- Education: Edinburgh University
- Occupation: Lighthouse engineer
- Employer: Northern Lighthouse Board
- Spouse: Annie Roberts (m. 1882)
- Children: D. E. Stevenson
- Parent(s): David Stevenson (father); Elizabeth Mackay (mother)
- Relatives: Charles Alexander Stevenson (brother)

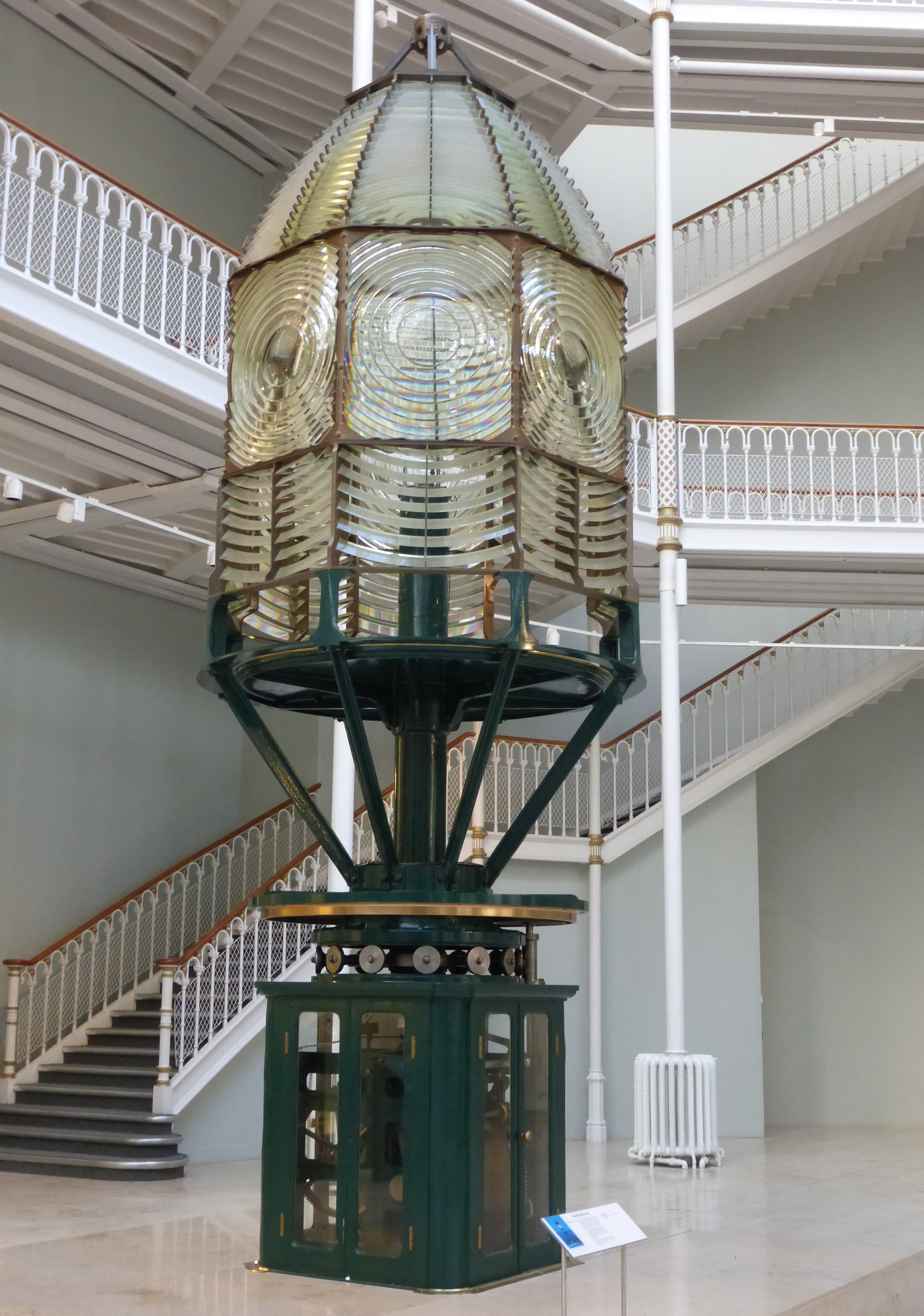
Dioptic lens designed by David Alan Stevenson for the Inchkeith Lighthouse in 1889, now in the National Museum of Scotland

David Alan Stevenson FRSE MIMechE FRSSA MICE (21 July 1854 in Edinburgh – 11 April 1938) was a lighthouse engineer who built 26 lighthouses in and around Scotland.

== Life ==
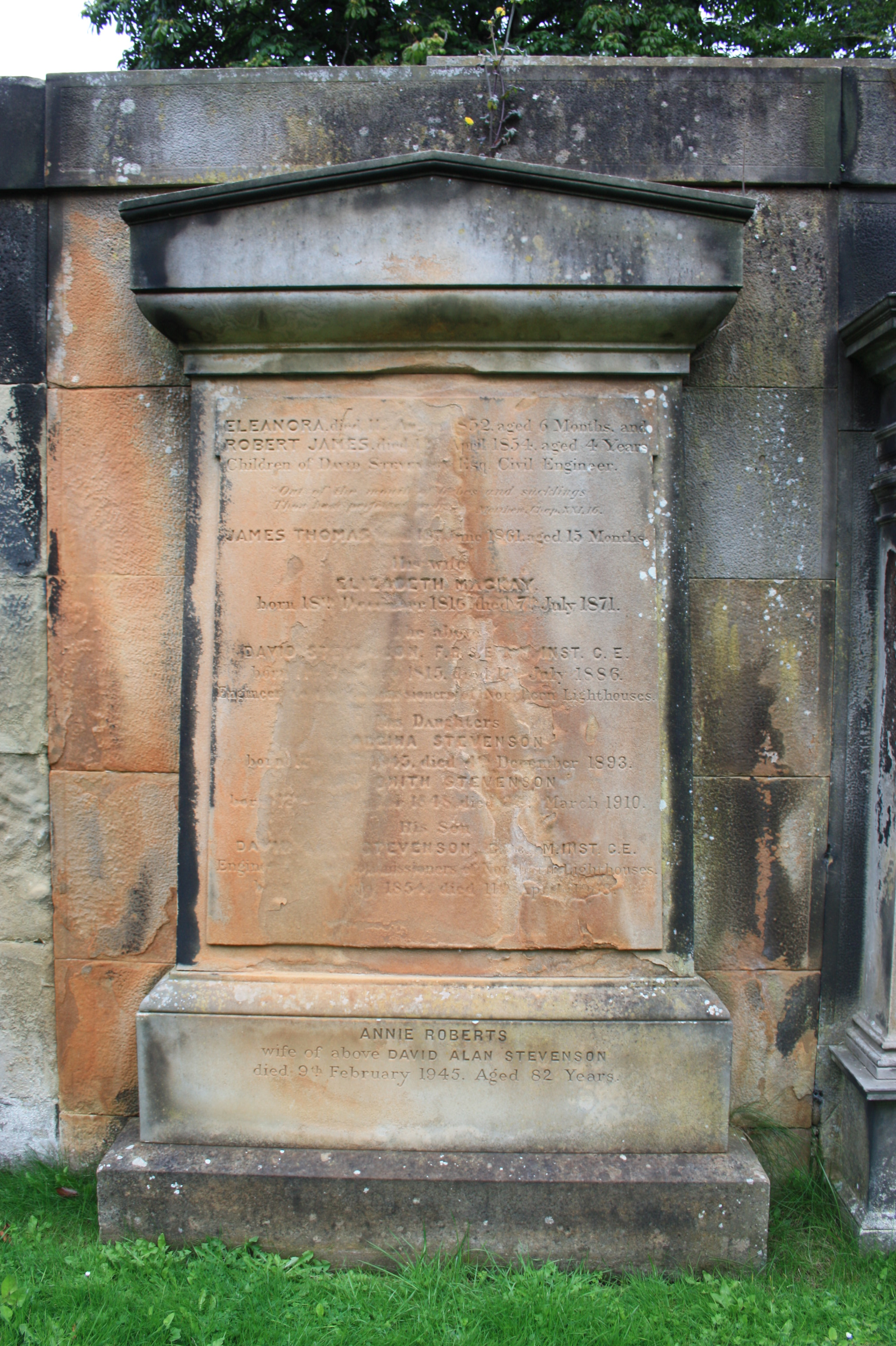
The Stevenson family grave, Dean Cemetery, Edinburgh

He was born on 21 July 1854 the son of David Stevenson and his wife, Elizabeth Mackay. His early years were spent at their home at 8 Forth Street in the eastern section of the New Town in Edinburgh. The family later moved to 45 Melville Street.

He was part of the famous Stevenson family of lighthouse engineers, including brother Charles Stevenson, uncle Thomas Stevenson, and grandfather Robert Stevenson. His cousin was the author Robert Louis Stevenson.

Stevenson was educated at Edinburgh Academy (1865–70) and then studied engineering at the University of Edinburgh, graduating BSc in 1875.

In 1884 he was elected a Fellow of the Royal Society of Edinburgh. His proposers were William Swan, Peter Guthrie Tait, Robert MacKay Smith and George Chrystal.

Stevenson died at his home, "Troqueer", in the Kingsknowe area of Edinburgh on 11 April 1938. He is buried in Dean Cemetery. The grave lies on the north wall of the original cemetery, backing onto the first northern extension. It is heavily worn.

== Family ==
In 1882 he married Annie Roberts (1862–1945). The family resided in Edinburgh's West End at 45 Melville Street.

Their daughter Dorothy Emily was born in 1892; she became a best-selling author of more than 40 books published under the name D. E. Stevenson. A commemorative plaque marks the house.

His nephew was also named David Alan Stevenson (1891–1971).

== Works ==
Between 1885 and 1886 he built three lighthouses with his uncle Thomas, and over the following 50 years, built a further 23 with his brother Charles.

From 1904 he was assisted by John Davidson Gardner who became his Chief assistant in 1911.

He retired aged 83 in March 1938.

=== Lighthouses of David A Stevenson ===
Stevenson worked on 26 lighthouses during his career. Among them are:

- Fidra (1885)
- Oxcar (1886)
- Ailsa Craig (1886)
- Skroo, Fair Isle (1892)
- Helliar Holm (1893)
- Sule Skerry (1895)
- Rattray Head (1895)
- Stroma (1896)
- Tod Head (1897): Catterline, Aberdeenshire, Scotland
- Noup Head (1898)
- Flannan Isles (1899)
- Tiumpan Head (1900)
- Killantringan (1900)
- Barns Ness (1901)
- Hoxa Head (1901)
- Bass Rock (1903)
- Hyskeir (1904)
- Trodday (1908)
- Neist Point (1909)
- Rubh Re (1912)
- Milaid Point (1912)
- Maughold Head (1914)
- Copinsay (1915)
- Clyth Ness (1916)
- Duncansby Head (1924)
- Brough of Birsay Lighthouse (1925)
- Ardtornish (1927)
- Esha Ness (1929)
- Tor Ness (1937)
