= Charles Alexander Stevenson =

Scottish engineer

- Born: 23 December 1855; Edinburgh, Scotland
- Died: 9 May 1950 (aged 94); Edinburgh, Scotland
- Education: University of Edinburgh
- Occupation: Lighthouse engineer
- Spouse: Margaret Sherriff
- Children: D. Alan Stevenson; Two daughters
- Parent(s): David Stevenson (father); Elizabeth Mackay (mother)
- Relatives: David Alan Stevenson (brother)

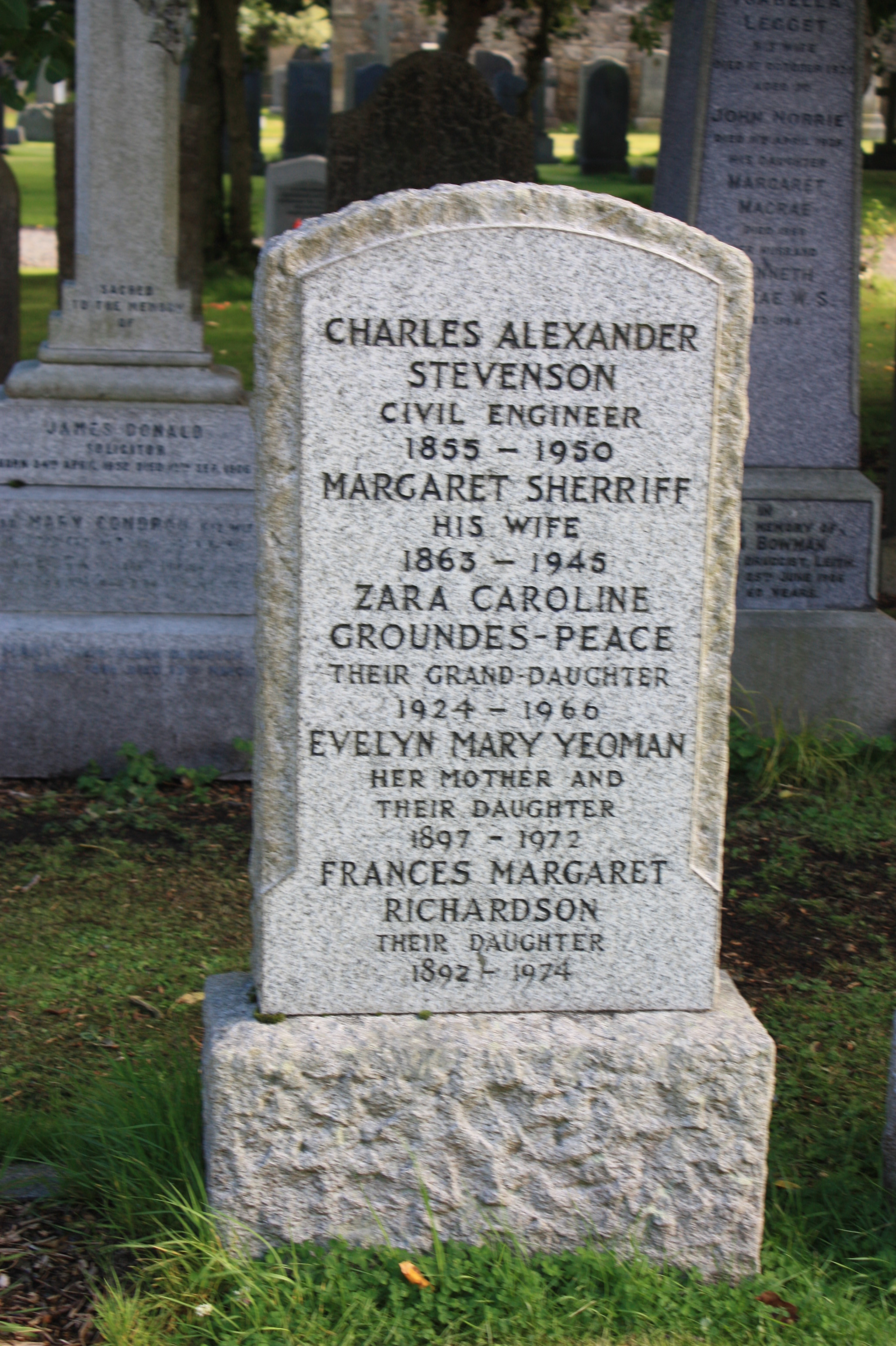
The grave of Charles Alexander Stevenson, Dean Cemetery, Edinburgh

Charles Alexander Stevenson MICE MIEE FRSE (23 December 1855 – 9 May 1950) was a Scottish lighthouse engineer who built twenty-three lighthouses in and around Scotland.

== Life ==
He was born at 8 Forth Street in the east part of Edinburgh's New Town The family moved to 20 Royal Terrace on Calton Hill shortly after his birth.

Born into the famous Stevenson family of lighthouse engineers, son of David Stevenson and his wife Elizabeth Mackay, brother of David Alan Stevenson, and nephew of Thomas Stevenson, he was educated at Edinburgh Academy 1866 to 1872 then studied mathematics and engineering at the University of Edinburgh where he graduated BSc. He joined the family business of lighthouse design in 1875 remaining unpaid as a family member until 1887 when his uncle, Thomas Stevenson died, after which he became a partner. Between 1887 and 1937 he built 23 lighthouses with his brother, David, and is noted for his experiments with optics. He also improved foghorns and created his own wireless communication system prior to Marconi's wireless.

In 1886, he was elected a Fellow of the Royal Society of Edinburgh. His proposers were Sir John Murray, Peter Guthrie Tait, George Chrystal and Alexander Buchan. In 1889 he published an account of recent earthquakes in Scotland, with tabulations and a map, based largely on the accounts of lighthouse keepers.

In March 1895, he was appointed examiner of Engineering students at St Andrews University.

He lived at 9 Manor Place in Edinburgh with Ernest Maddox as his neighbour at 7 Manor Place.

He died on 9 May 1950. He is buried in the first northern extension to Dean Cemetery in western Edinburgh. The grave lies on the north path towards the north-east corner. His son David Alan Stevenson lies alongside.

== Family ==
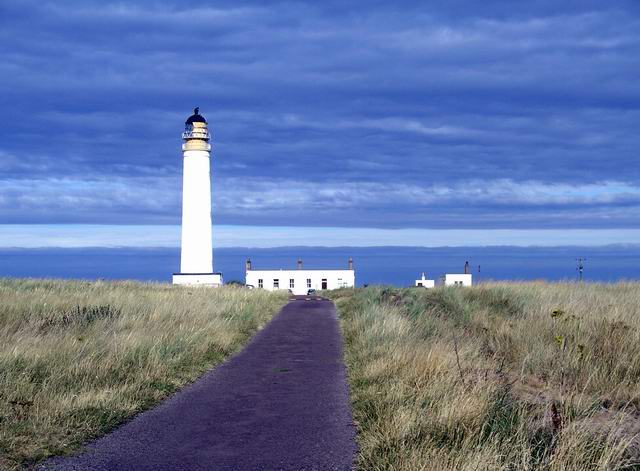
Barns Ness lighthouse

He married Margaret Sherriff (1863–1945). With her he had two daughters and a son, David Alan (1891–1971), who was the last of the family to enter the profession of lighthouse design.

His cousin was Robert Louis Stevenson, and grandfather was the lighthouse engineer, Robert Stevenson.

== Lighthouses of Charles A Stevenson ==
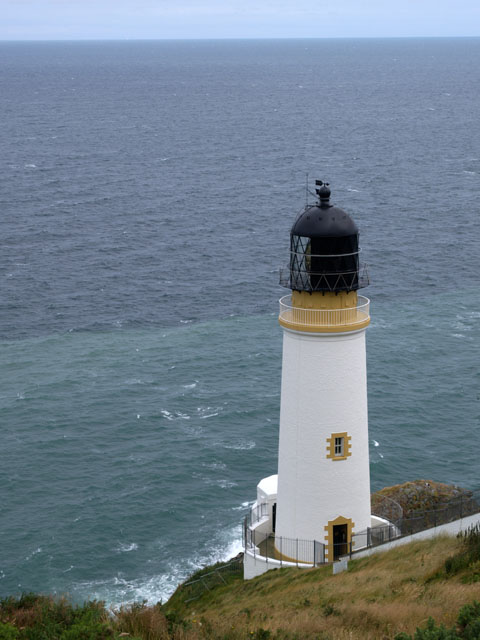
Maughold Head lighthouse

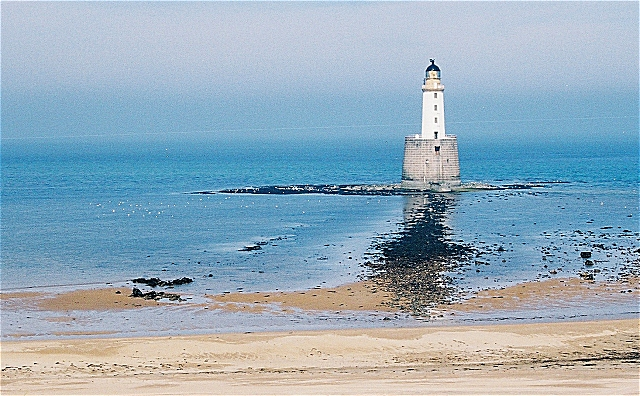
Rattray Head Lighthouse

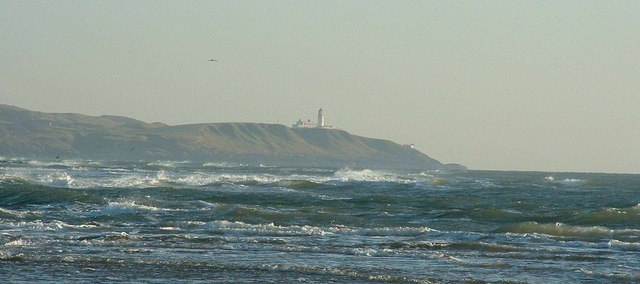
Killintringan Lighthouse from Larbrax Bay

- Skroo, Fair Isle (1892)
- Helliar Holm (1893)
- Sule Skerry (1895)
- Rattray Head (1895)
- Stroma (1896)
- Tod Head (1897)
- Noup Head (1898)
- Flannan Isles (1899)
- Tiumpan Head (1900)
- Killantringan (1900) originally including a gigantic foghorn
- Barns Ness (1901)
- Bass Rock (1903)
- Hyskeir (1904)
- Trodday (1908)
- Neist Point (1909)
- Sandaig Light, Glenelg (1910)
- Rubh Re (1912)
- Milaid Point (1912)
- Maughold Head (1914)
- Copinsay (1915)
- Clyth Ness (1916)
- Duncansby Head (1924)
- Esha Ness (1929)
- Tor Ness (1937)
