= Aultgrishan =

Coordinates: 57.804909°N 5.802382°W

Aultgrishan: Scottish Gaelic: Allt Ghrìsean
- Location within the Highland council area
- OS grid reference: NG7418685826
- Council area: Highland
- Country: Scotland
- Sovereign state: United Kingdom
- Post town: Gairloch
- Postcode district: IV21 2
- Police: Scotland
- Fire: Scottish
- Ambulance: Scottish
- UK Parliament: Ross, Skye and Lochaber
- Scottish Parliament: Caithness, Sutherland and Ross

Aultgrishan (Scottish Gaelic: Allt Ghrìsean) is a small crofting community near Gairloch, Ross-shire. It adjoins Melvaig, within Highland region and is in the Scottish council area of Highland.

Aultgrishan is reached from the main B8021 single-track B-road that forks from the A832 in Gairloch and follows the north coast of the sea loch, Loch Gairloch, travelling west through Lonemore to Big Sand, before travelling north past North Erradale through Peterburn and Aultgrishan before terminating at Melvaig. The road then becomes narrower and continues about four miles to Rua Reidh Lighthouse.
