= Redpoint, Highland =

Human settlement in Highland, Scotland

Coordinates: 57.6522°N 5.78276°W

Redpoint: Scottish Gaelic: An Rubha Dearg
- Location within the Highland council area
- OS grid reference: NG744687
- Civil parish: Gairloch
- Council area: Highland
- Lieutenancy area: Ross and Cromarty
- Country: Scotland
- Sovereign state: United Kingdom
- Post town: Gairloch
- Postcode district: IV21
- Dialling code: 01445
- Police: Scotland
- Fire: Scottish
- Ambulance: Scottish
- UK Parliament: Ross, Skye and Lochaber
- Scottish Parliament: Ross, Skye and Inverness West

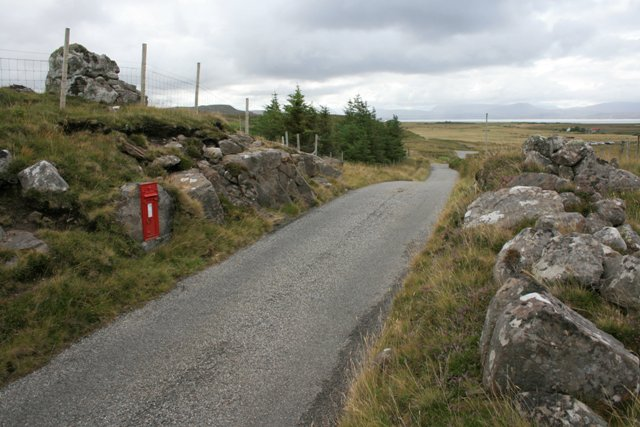
B8056, Redpoint With a post box set into a rock on a high point on the road.

Redpoint (Scottish Gaelic: An Rubha Dearg, lit. 'the red headland') is a small settlement in the north west of Highland, Scotland. It takes its name from Red Point, a low promontory to the south, which marks a turn in the coastline from facing west to south east as it becomes Loch Torridon.

Redpoint lies about 10 miles (16 km) south west of Gairloch, at the end of the B8056 road. A path leading from the road leads to a viewpoint from which it is possible (on a clear day) to see the Isle of Skye's Trotternish Ridge and also the Isle of Harris and Isle of Lewis.

The villages of South Erradale, Opinan and Port Henderson are north along the B8056 coast road.

Scottish electronic music band Boards of Canada released the album Geogaddi in 2002 that contains the track "The Beach at Redpoint".
