= List of listed buildings in Gairloch, Highland =

This is a list of listed buildings in the parish of Gairloch in Highland, Scotland.

== List ==
Name	Location	Date Listed	Grid Ref. (Note: Sometimes known as OSGB36, the grid reference (where provided) is based on the British national grid reference system used by the Ordnance Survey. • "Guide to National Grid". Ordnance Survey. • "Get-a-map". Ordnance Survey.)	Geo-coordinates	Notes	LB Number (Note: Historic Environment Scotland assign a unique alphanumeric identifier to each designated site in Scotland, for listed buildings this always begins with "LB", for example "LB12345".)	Image
Midtown, Inverasdale, School, Former Free Church				57°48′04″N 5°40′06″W	Category B	12919	Upload Photo
Badachro, Aird House				57°42′08″N 5°43′32″W	Category C(S)	12920	Upload Photo
Badachro Inn, Badachro, With Boathouse And Jetties				57°41′55″N 5°43′23″W	Category B	12921	Upload Photo
South Erradale Causeway Over River Erradale (On B8056 Road)				57°40′29″N 5°47′07″W	Category B	7901	Upload Photo
Flowerdale House (Including Westerdale) And Walled Garden				57°42′53″N 5°40′17″W	Category A	7910	Upload another image See more images
Gairloch, Strath, Strathgair House Steading And Walled Garden				57°43′56″N 5°41′55″W	Category C(S)	7887	Upload Photo
Letterewe Furnace Cottage				57°40′38″N 5°25′24″W	Category C(S)	7893	Upload Photo
3 Mellon Udrigle				57°54′14″N 5°33′39″W	Category B	7894	Upload Photo
Poolewe The Old Manse				57°45′36″N 5°35′52″W	Category C(S)	7897	Upload Photo
Rubha Reidh Lighthouse				57°51′38″N 5°48′27″W	Category B	49894	Upload another image See more images
Charleston House				57°42′37″N 5°40′42″W	Category B	12917	Upload Photo
Poolewe Cliff House				57°46′02″N 5°36′32″W	Category B	7898	Upload Photo
Kerrysdale House				57°41′51″N 5°39′25″W	Category C(S)	7889	Upload Photo
Gairloch Old Kirkyard				57°43′13″N 5°41′12″W	Category B	12918	Upload Photo
Poolewe Srondubh House And Former Steading				57°46′14″N 5°35′47″W	Category B	7900	Upload Photo
27 Big Sand, House And Outbuilding				57°44′43″N 5°46′47″W	Category B	7908	Upload Photo
Gairloch Parish Church, Church Of Scotland				57°42′59″N 5°40′58″W	Category C(S)	7885	Upload another image See more images
11 Melvaig				57°48′42″N 5°48′03″W	Category B	7895	Upload Photo
Badachro, Eilean Tioram (Dry Island), Former Fishing Station Including House And Jetty				57°42′04″N 5°43′31″W	Category B	12925	Upload Photo
Letterewe Watch House (Now Garden Store)				57°41′06″N 5°26′17″W	Category B	7891	Upload Photo
Letterewe Steading				57°41′06″N 5°26′13″W	Category C(S)	7892	Upload Photo
Poolewe Parish Church. Church Of Scotland				57°46′00″N 5°36′17″W	Category B	7896	Upload another image See more images
Aultbea, Bridge Over Allt Beithe				57°50′23″N 5°35′01″W	Category C(S)	7907	Upload Photo
Charleston Bridge				57°42′46″N 5°40′38″W	Category C(S)	7909	Upload another image See more images
Gairloch Free Church Of Scotland				57°43′13″N 5°41′14″W	Category B	7886	Upload another image See more images
Letterewe House And Rear Service				57°41′07″N 5°26′17″W	Category C(S)	7890	Upload Photo
Poolewe Bridge Over River Ewe				57°45′57″N 5°36′12″W	Category B	7899	Upload Photo
Flowerdale Barn				57°42′50″N 5°40′13″W	Category B	7884	Upload another image
Gairloch The Old Police Station				57°43′42″N 5°41′27″W	Category C(S)	7888	Upload Photo
Tollie (Clapper) Bridge Over Allt A'Pholl-Choire To Nw Of Tollie Farm				57°44′52″N 5°35′47″W	Category B	46976	Upload Photo
Udrigle House				57°52′56″N 5°33′03″W	Category A	7902	Upload Photo

== Key ==
The scheme for classifying buildings in Scotland is:

- Category A: "buildings of national or international importance, either architectural or historic; or fine, little-altered examples of some particular period, style or building type."
- Category B: "buildings of regional or more than local importance; or major examples of some particular period, style or building type, which may have been altered."
- Category C: "buildings of local importance; lesser examples of any period, style, or building type, as originally constructed or moderately altered; and simple traditional buildings which group well with other listed buildings."

In March 2016 there were 47,288 listed buildings in Scotland. Of these, 8% were Category A, and 50% were Category B, with the remaining 42% being Category C.

== See also ==
- List of listed buildings in Highland
