= Loch Bràigh Horrisdale =

- Loch Horrisdale
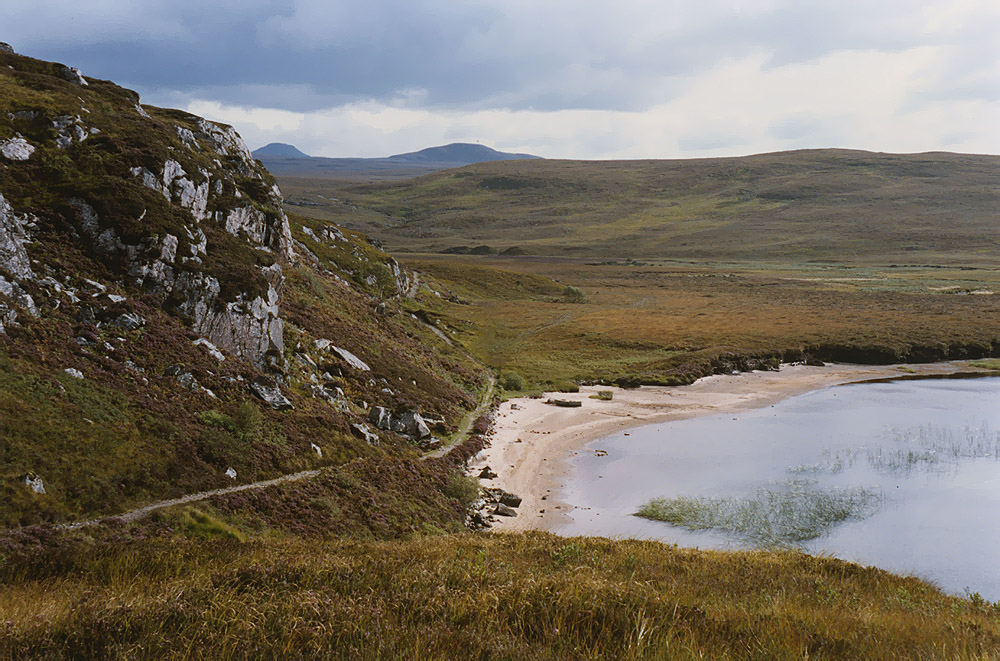
- The eastern shore of Loch Braigh Horrisdale

- Location within Highland
- Location: Gairloch, Wester Ross, Scotland
- Coordinates: 57°40′9″N 5°41′41″W
- Type: freshwater loch
- Primary inflows: streams from Loch a' Bhealaich and Loch a' Ghobhainn
- Primary outflows: Badachro River
- Basin countries: Scotland
- Max. length: 0.75 mi (1.21 km)
- Max. width: 0.33 mi (0.53 km)
- Surface area: 38.2 ha (94 acres)
- Average depth: 18 ft (5.5 m)
- Max. depth: 51 ft (16 m)
- Water volume: 62,000,000 ft^{3} (1,800,000 m^{3})
- Shore length^{1}: 3.7 km (3.7 km)
- Surface elevation: 92 m (302 ft)
- ^{1} Shore length is not a well-defined measure.

Loch Bràigh Horrisdale is a small, irregular shaped, freshwater loch in Wester Ross, in the north west of Scotland. The loch lies approximately 2 mi (3.2 km) south southeast of the village of Badachro and is close to the Fairy Lochs.

An in-river hydro-electric scheme down-stream of the loch has been proposed. As a result of this, an environmental assessment of the fish and fish habitat of the loch and its outflow was commissioned. The assessment was reported in 2014. A full EIA planning application for the 2MW scheme was lodged with Highland Council by Three Lochs Hydro Ltd on 28 July 2016.

The loch was surveyed on 6 August 1902 by T.N. Johnston and John Hewitt and later charted as part of the Sir John Murray's Bathymetrical Survey of Fresh-Water Lochs of Scotland 1897-1909.

== See also ==
- List of lochs in Scotland
