= Loch Sguod =

Loch in Wester Ross, Scotland

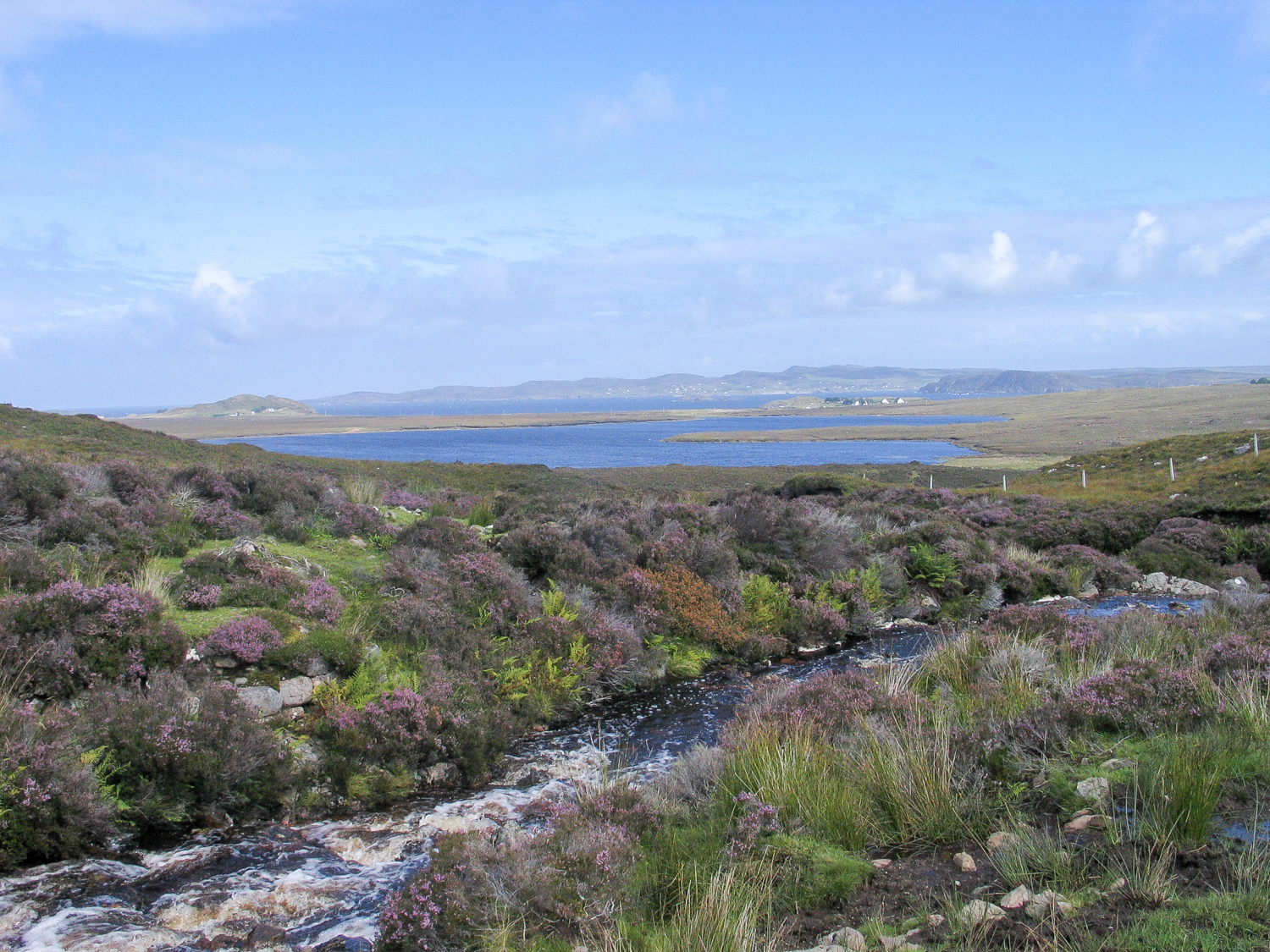
- View from Abhainn Ur with Loch Sguod in the distance

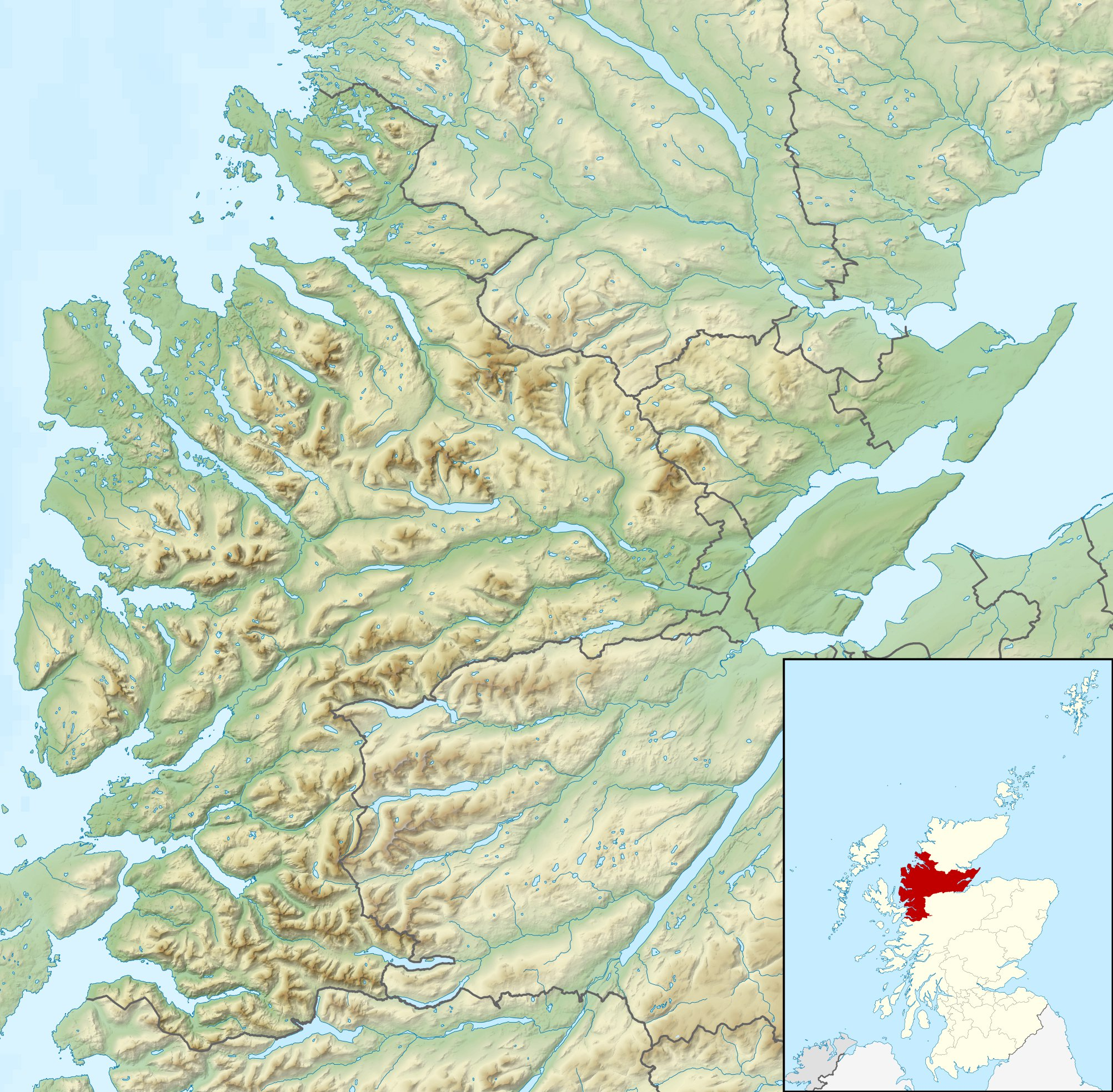
- Location in Wester Ross
- Location: NG81088734
- Coordinates: 57.822551°N 5.688161°W
- Type: freshwater loch
- Basin countries: Scotland
- Max. length: 1.2 km (0.75 mi)
- Max. width: 0.4 km (0.25 mi)
- Surface area: 42 ha (100 acres)
- Average depth: 6.8 ft (2.1 m)
- Max. depth: 14.1 ft (4.3 m)
- Water volume: 31,172,997.9 ft^{3} (882,721.00 m^{3})
- Shore length^{1}: 3 km (1.9 mi)
- Surface elevation: 16 m (52 ft)
- Max. temperature: 57.2 °F (14.0 °C) at 0 feet.
- ^{1} Shore length is not a well-defined measure.

Loch Squod is a small remote freshwater hill loch located approximately 5 miles north-by-northwest of Poolewe and is directly west of the Isle of Ewe in Wester Ross, Scotland. Directly south is the remote hamlet of Inverasdale.

== Geography ==
Loch Squod is located at the base of the flat Inverasdale Peatlands plain located on the eastern and southern side of the Melvaig Peninsula. The peatlands are a site of special scientific interest. It is bounded by the Loch Maree Fault that forms a ridge to the west and Loch Ewe to the east. The loch drains north-east via the Uidh Chrò burn into Firemore beach and sea loch, Loch Ewe.

== Gallery ==
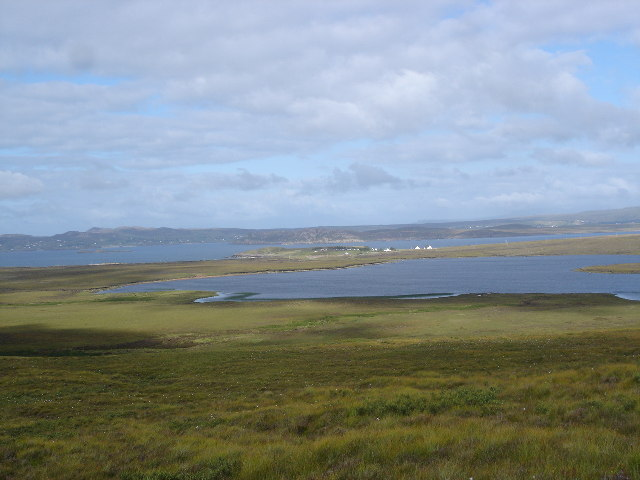
Loch Sguod with Loch Ewe in the background

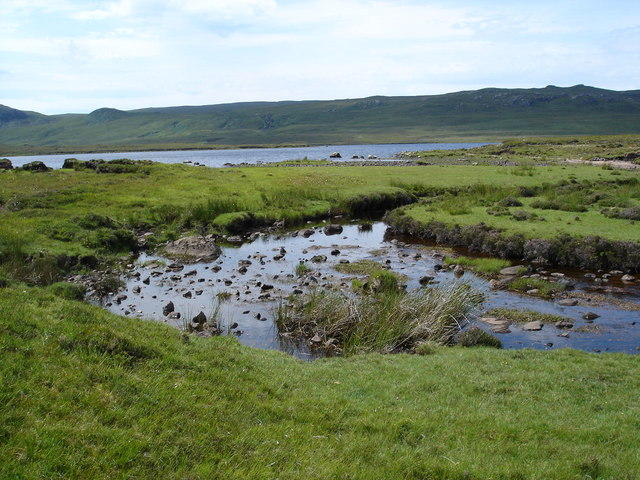
Uidh Chrò, the outflow of Loch Sgoud

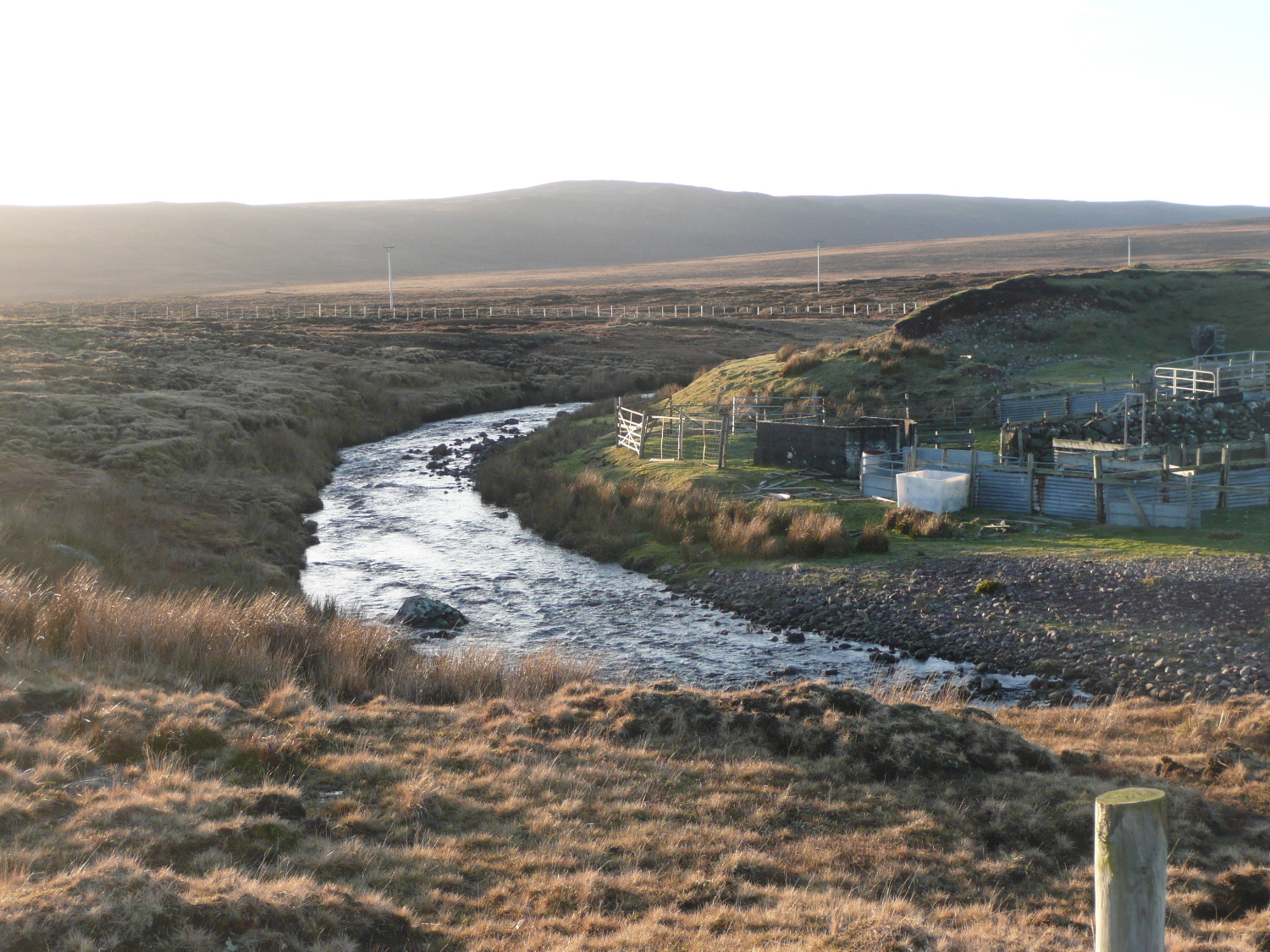
The Uidh Chrò burn with the ridge shown behind caused by Loch Maree fault.

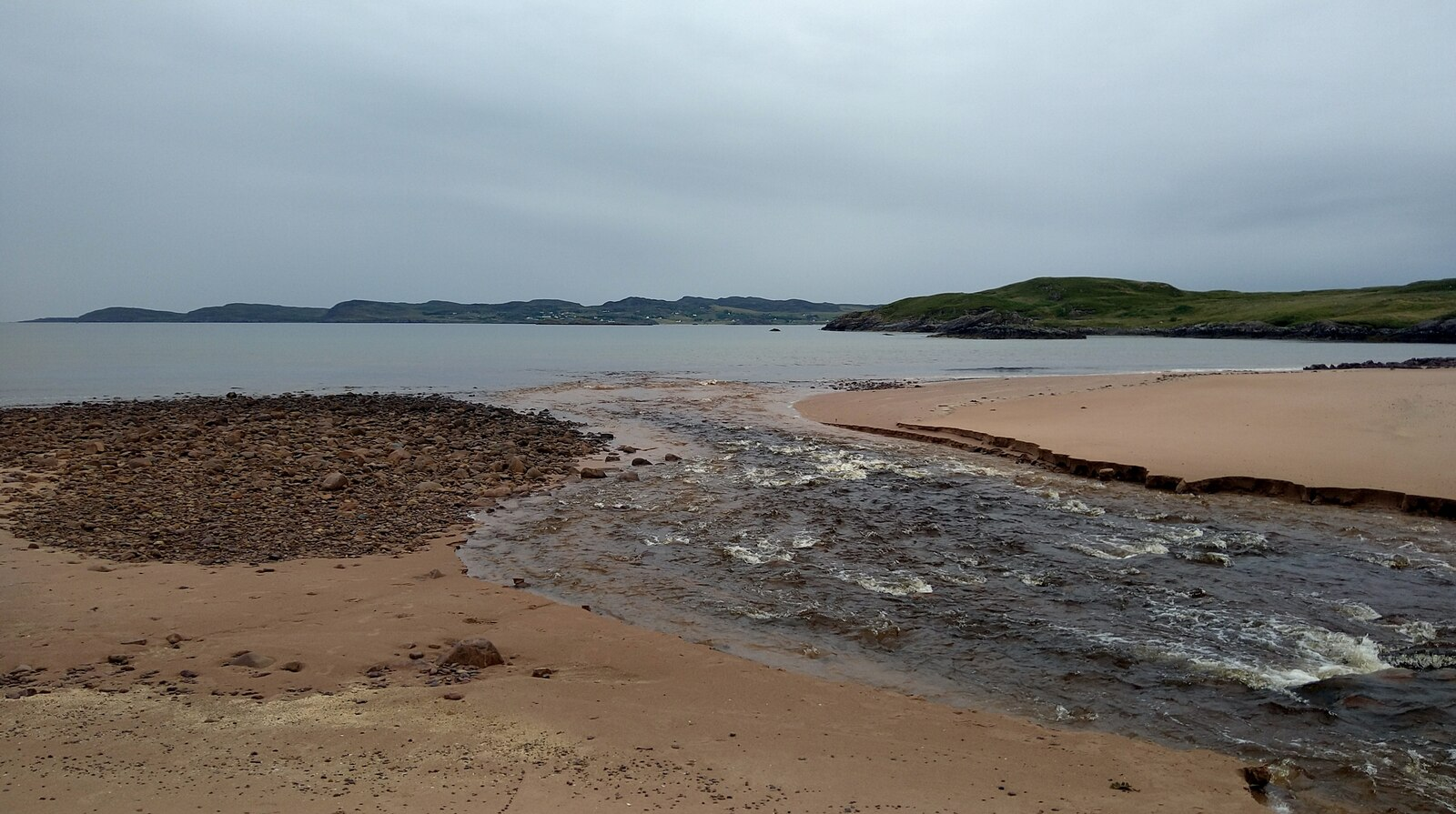
Another view of the lochs outflow
