= South Erradale =

Coordinates: 57.67074°N 5.76353°W

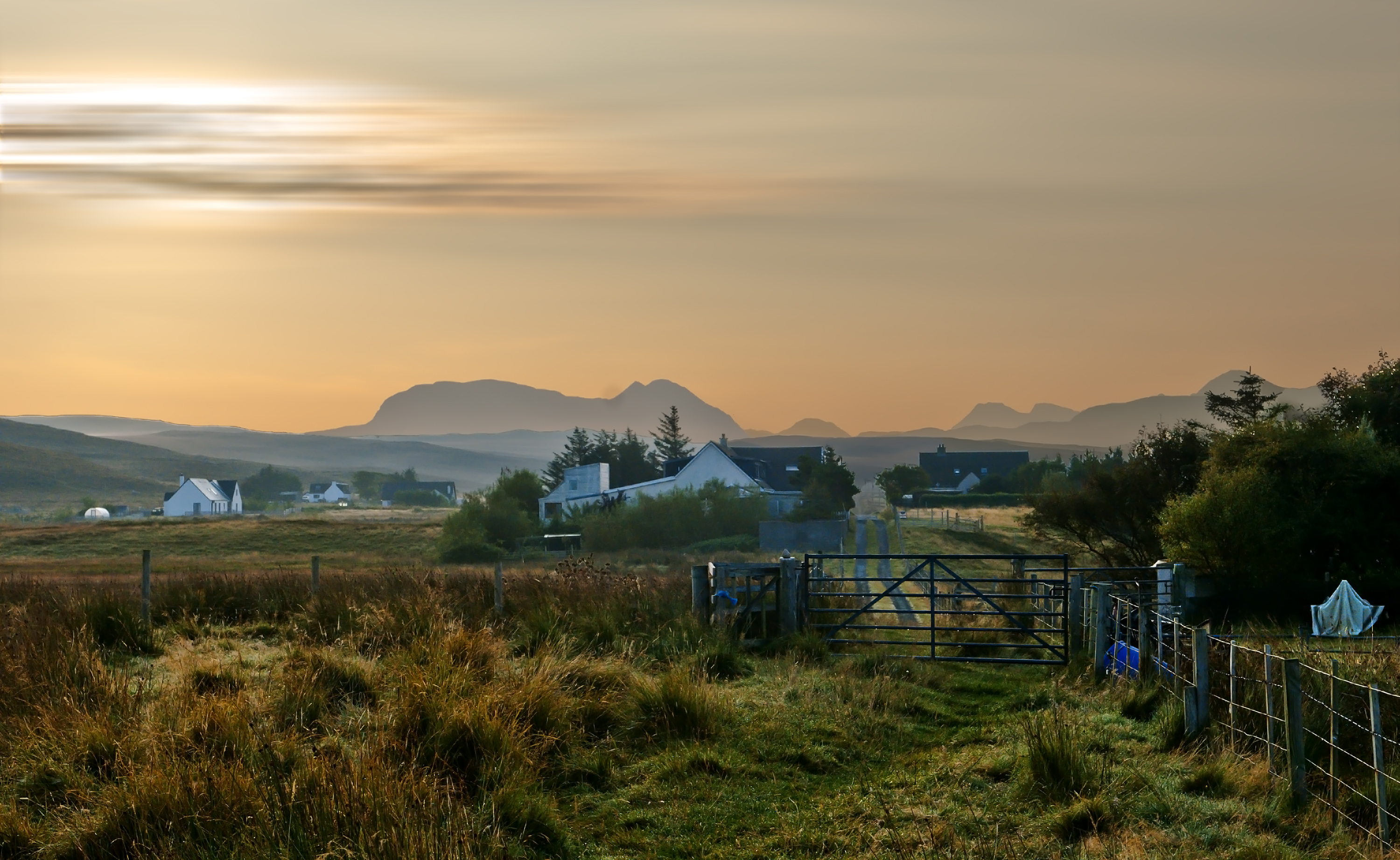
- South Erradale

- Location within the Ross and Cromarty area
- OS grid reference: NG756707
- Council area: Highland
- Country: Scotland
- Sovereign state: United Kingdom
- Post town: Gairloch
- Postcode district: IV21 2
- Police: Scotland
- Fire: Scottish
- Ambulance: Scottish

South Erradale is a small hamlet, situated on the coastline and to the southwest of Gairloch in Ross and Cromarty, Scottish Highlands and is in the Scottish council area of Highland.

South Erradale lies one mile (1.5 kilometres) south of Opinan and two miles (three kilometres) southeast of Port Henderson along the B8056 coast road and three miles (five kilometres) north east of Redpoint.
