= Port Mòr (disambiguation) =

Port Mòr can be

- Port Mòr, a location in Big Sand, Scotland
- Port Mòr, a location in Oban, Scotland
- Port Mòr, a location on Colonsay, Scotland
- Port Mòr, a location on Gigha, Scotland
- Port Mòr, a location on Great Bernera, Scotland
- Port Mòr, a location on Isle of Arran, Scotland
- Port Mòr, a location on Muck, Scotland
- Port Mòr, a location on Oronsay, Inner Hebrides
- Port Mòr, a location on Tiree, Scotland
