= Loch Airigh an Eilein =

Lake in Wester Ross, Highland, Scotland

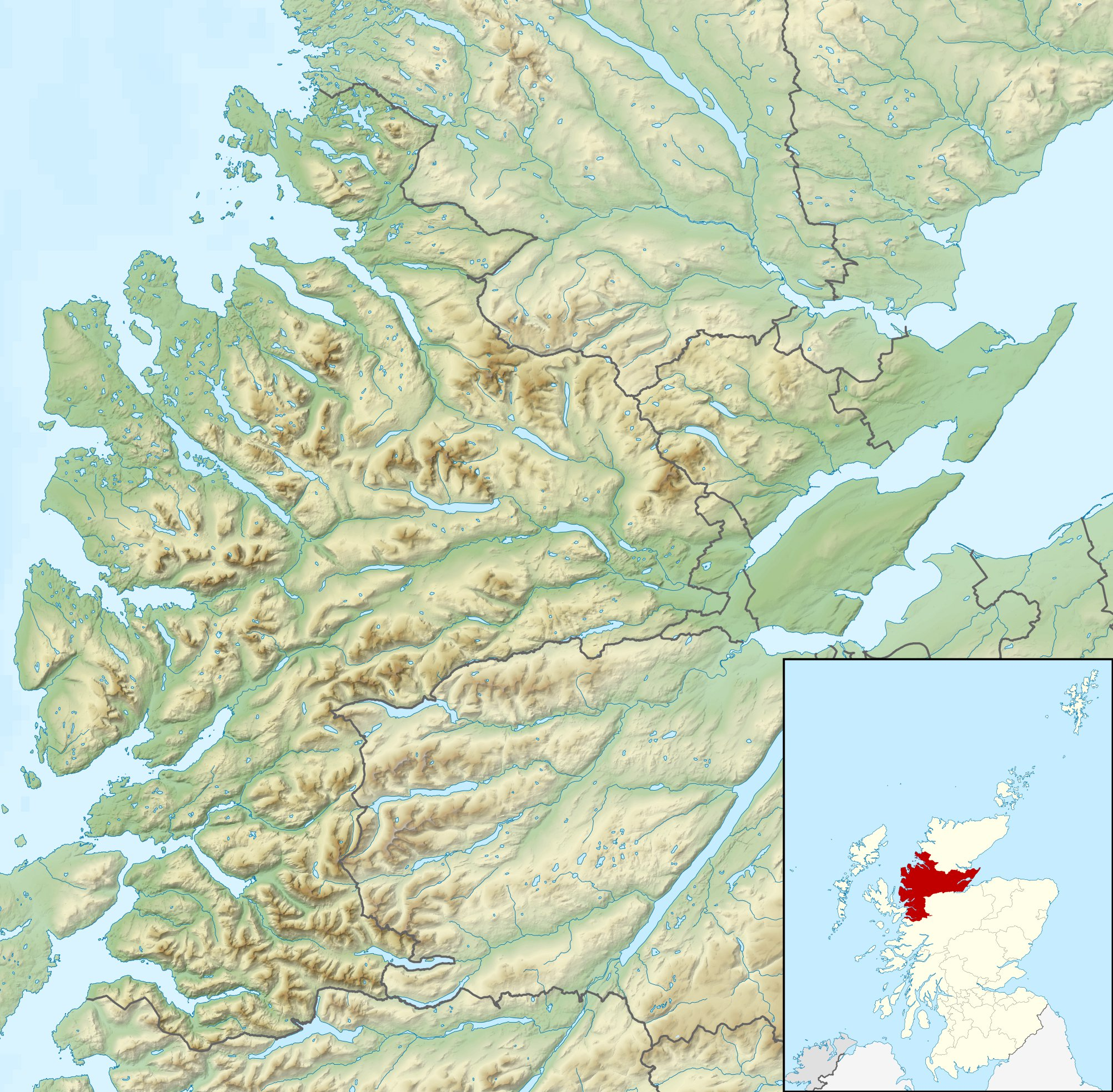
- Location within Ross and Cromarty
- Location: Scottish Highlands
- Coordinates: 57°50′32.5″N 5°43′21.3″W
- Basin countries: Scotland, United Kingdom
- Max. length: 491.5 m (1,613 ft)
- Max. width: 355 m (1,165 ft)
- Surface elevation: 60 m (200 ft)
- Islands: 1

Loch Airigh an Eilein is a lochan (small loch) in Wester Ross, Scotland roughly 4 km northwest of the scattered crofting settlement of Inverasdale.

Its name derives from Scottish Gaelic and translates to "Loch of the Shieling of the Island", in reference to the small island off the lochan's western shore.

Loch Airigh an Eilein sits within the Applecross geological formation of sandstone bedrock, with large glacial deposits of sand and silt along its southwest shore.

Over 116 bird species have been spotted in the lochan's immediate vicinity, including the black-throated diver, grey wagtail, and Arctic tern.
