= Gairloch Stone =

Archaeological artifact discovered in Scotland

Coordinates: 57°43′48″N 5°41′37″W

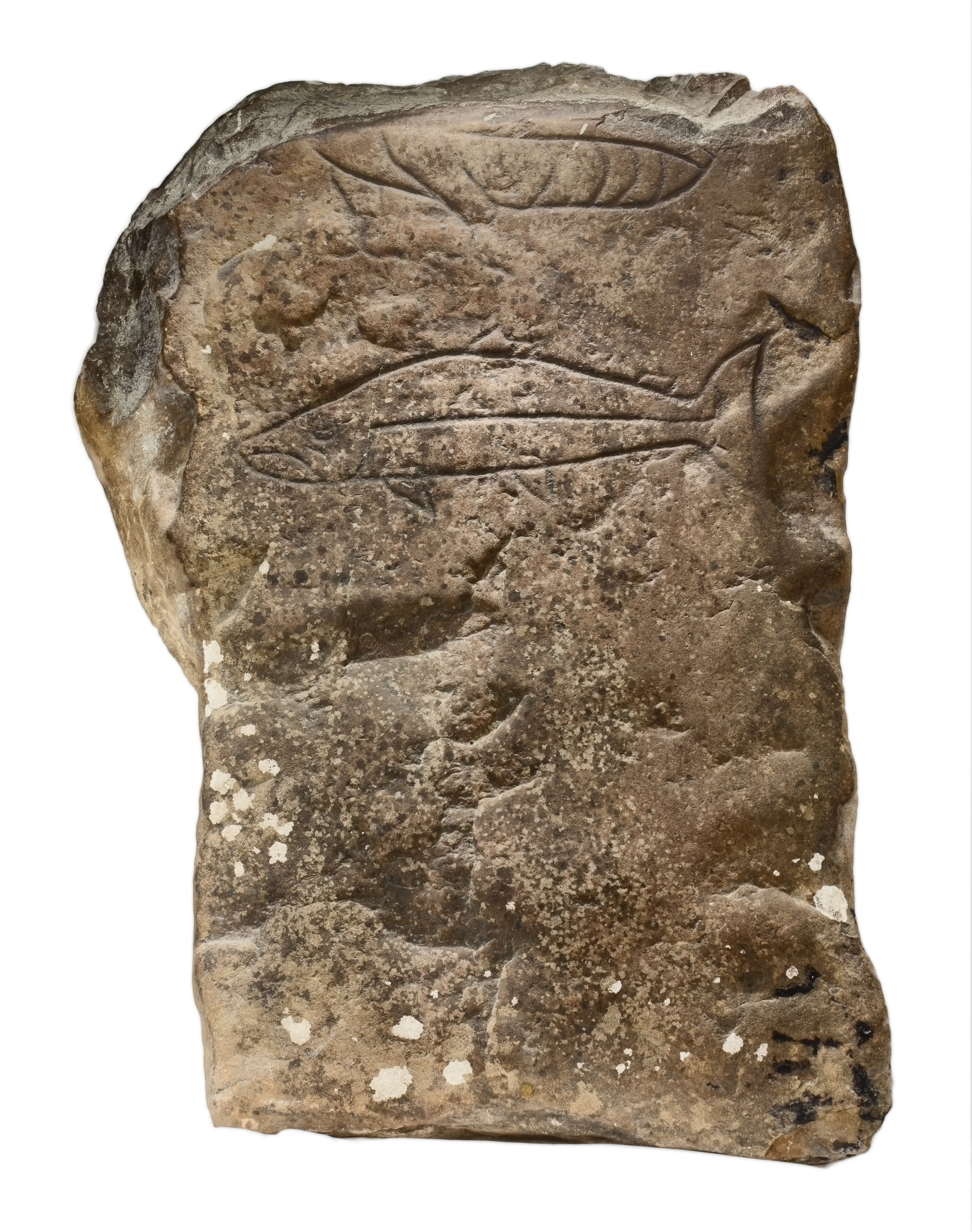
The Gairloch Stone

The Gairloch Stone is a Class-I Pictish stone that was discovered at Achtercairn in Wester Ross, Scotland, around 1880. Subsequently, the stone was used as masonry for the cemetery wall of Gairloch's church. It has survived only imperfectly, but on it are still visible a fish—probably a salmon—and, above, the lower part of a bird. The bird is probably an eagle, common on Pictish stones, but a goose has also been suggested.

The stone currently resides in Gairloch Heritage Museum.
