= Finlay MacKinnon =

Scottish painter (1863-1931)

Finlay MacKinnon (2 June 1863 – 9 July 1931). Also known as "The Poolewe Artist" was late 19th - early 20th century Scottish watercolourist and illustrator.

== Early life ==
Finlay MacKinnon was born Finlay Urquhart in Poolewe, Wester Ross in 1863, to Isabella Urquhart, a domestic servant, and Finlay MacKinnon, an excise officer.

In his youth, his interest in art came to the attention of John H. Dixon (F.S.A.) who started him on a course of instruction. Dixon wrote of MacKinnon in his 1886 book " Gairloch in North-West Ross-Shire: Its Records, Traditions, Inhabitants, and Natural History" in the chapter "The Poolewe Artist":

"In the autumn of 1877 I was going out for a sail on Loch Ewe; the boatmaster, requiring a boy to assist, engaged Finlay Mackinnon (then a little barelegged lad), who happened to be standing by, and with whom I was scarcely acquainted at the time. During our trip I got into conversation with Finlay, and asked him whether he was to become a fisherman or sailor. He answered, "No." "What have you a fancy for?" I inquired. The quaint reply in his then rather imperfect English was, "All my mind is with the drawing." He afterwards shewed me his childish efforts with his pencil, and some very humble attempts in water-colour achieved by the aid of a shilling box of paints! I started him in a course of instruction, and Mrs Mackenzie of Inverewe gave him great assistance. He progressed rapidly. About 1881 it was his good fortune to come under the notice of Mr H. B. W. Davis, R.A. (who has so splendidly rendered some of the scenery and Highland cattle of Loch Maree), and Mr Davis kindly helped him forward, and in 1883 had him to London where he gave him a session's teaching at South Kensington. Other gentlemen, including Sir Kenneth Mackenzie, Bart. of Gairloch, the Marquis of Bristol, Mr O. H. Mackenzie of Inverewe, Mr John Bateson, lessee of Shieldaig, Mr A. Hamond, also lessee of Shieldaig, and Mr A. W. Weedon, the artist, gave Finlay Mackinnon material aid, and he was enabled to spend the winter session of 1884-5 at South Kensington"

In addition to sessions at South Kensington (Now the Royal College of Art), he also studied in Paris and Italy.

After his training he returned to live in Poolewe, but was a regular visitor to London. He always wore the kilt, which in combination with his broad Wester-Ross accent led to him being regarded by the London art world as the archetypal Scotsman.

== Marriage ==
On 30 March 1898 MacKinnon married Isabel Agnes Mackenzie Matheson at St Columba's Church, Pont Street, London.

== Exhibiting and Illustration ==
MacKinnon exhibited at the Royal Academy (19), Royal Scottish Academy(1) AAS(4) & Walker Art Gallery, Liverpool(16)

He also provided illustrations for a number of natural history books, the best known being Hugh Fraser's 'Amid the High Hills' (1923) and 'The Immortal Isles' by Seton Gordon (1926)

== Active service ==
MacKinnon's military service began as a Private with the 1st VB Seaforth Highlanders, subsequently the 4th Battalion Seaforth Highlander's T.A. He was promoted to Lieutenant in 1893 and Captain in 1898. It was as a reserve officer that he resumed duty in 1914, seeing active service in France and Belgium.

== Death ==
Finlay MacKinnon died in Poolewe 1931 aged 61. He is buried in Gairloch New Cemetery.

A memorial exhibition of MacKinnon's work was held in November 1932, the year after his death at Walker's Galleries, New Bond Street London.

== Wartime Sketches and Watercolours ==
MacKinnon recorded his service on the Western Front in pencil and watercolour sketches. Some of these sketches were used as illustrations for the 1927 book "History of the Fourth Battalion The Seaforth Highlanders - With Some Account of the Military Annals of Ross, the Fencibles, the Volunteers, and the Home Defence and Reserve Battalions 1914-1919" by Lieutenant-Colonel M.M. Haldane.

In 2021 the sketchbook was donated to the Gairloch Museum. A grant from the Association for Independent Museums allowed the museum to fund the conservation of the album.

During March and April 2023 the museum featured an exhibition on Mackinnon's life and work with the sketchbook forming the main exhibit. As well as the album being on display, the artworks inside were digitised and projected during the exhibition.

A booklet entitled 'Finlay MacKinnon, The Poolewe Artist' has been published by the museum to accompany the exhibition.
