= Fairy Lochs =

Small group of freshwater lochs

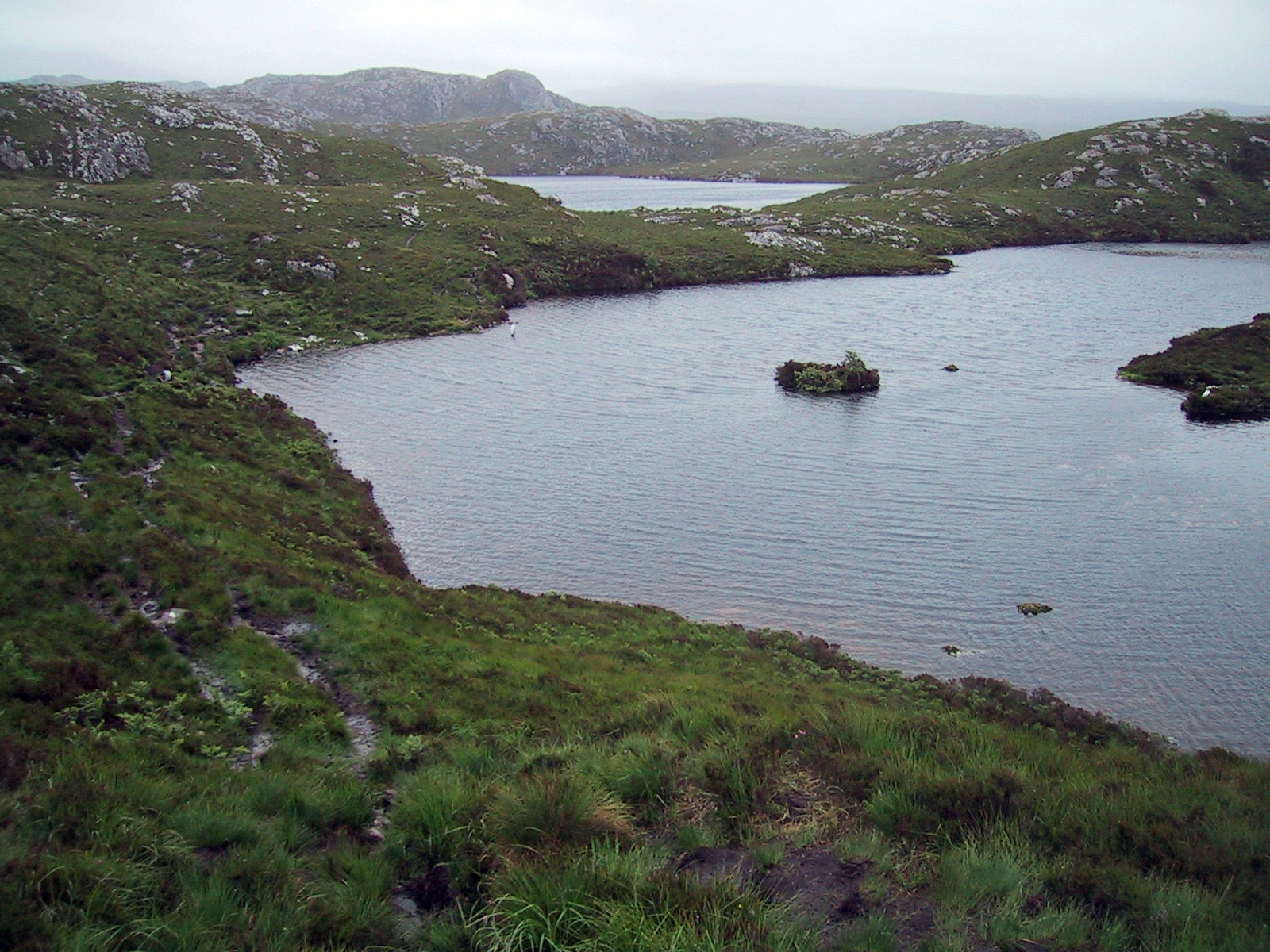
- Fairy Lochs/ Lochan Sgeireach

- Location within Scotland
- Location: Wester Ross, Highland
- Coordinates: 57°40′32″N 5°40′31″W

The Fairy Lochs are a recent English name for Na Lochan Sgeireach, a small group of freshwater lochans approximately 2 mi (3.2 km) south-east of the village of Badachro, near Gairloch in Wester Ross, Highland. The lochans have become known as the 'Fairy Lochs' due to their proximity to the hill Sìthean Mòr, which translates as "Big Fairy Mound".

The lochans are close to Loch Bràigh Horrisdale, which flows into the Badachro River (Scottish Gaelic: Abhainn Bad a' Chrodha). There are several large waterfalls in the area, and Sìthean Mòr overlooks the Lochan Sgeireach and the bay of Loch Gairloch.

The lochs are remote and are accessed over farmland and along paths through marshy ground.

== USAAF Liberator crash memorial ==
USAAF 42-95095 crash site, Fairy Lochs
- Scotland, United Kingdom
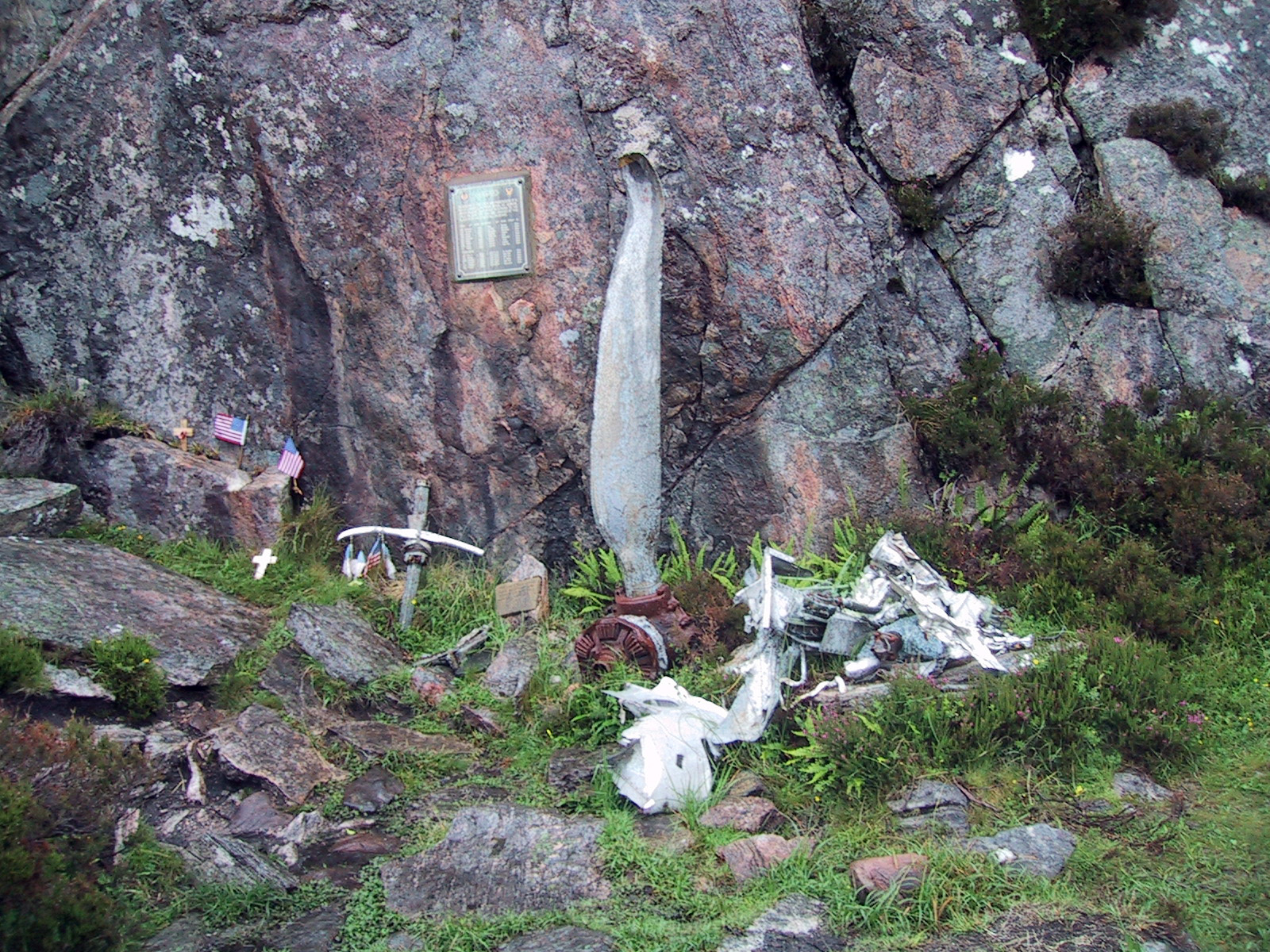
- Aircraft wreckage arranged to form a simple memorial
- For The crew & passengers of USAAF 42-95095, lost in an air crash on 13 June 1945,
- Location: 57.6766°N 5.6777°W near Badachro, Wester Ross
- IN MEMORY OF THE CREW AND PASSENGERS OF A B-24-H LIBERATOR BOMBER, SERIAL NO. 42-95095, WHICH BECAME LOST WHILE RETURNING TO THE U.S.A. ON JUNE 13TH, 1945, AND CRASHED AT THIS PLACE WITH THE LOSS OF ALL ON BOARD.

Although small and remote, the Fairy Lochs are notable as the crash site of an American World War II bomber. On 13 June 1945, a USAAF B-24 Liberator bomber (serial 42-95095, based at the Warton Aerodrome) was returning to the US from Prestwick Airfield at the end of World War II.

On board were a crew of nine from the 66th Bomber Squadron and six passengers from the Air Transport Command.

The aircraft's planned route to Keflavík (Meeks Field) in Iceland should have taken it over Stornoway in the Outer Hebrides, however, for reasons unknown, the aircraft flew instead over the Scottish mainland. Over Wester Ross the aircraft began to lose height and struck the summit of Slioch (980 metres (3,220 feet)), losing parts of its bomb bay doors, before flying on towards Gairloch. An attempted crash-landing resulted in the aircraft colliding with rocks and crashing into the Fairy Lochs, scattering wreckage over a wide area. All 15 crew and passengers on board perished in the accident.

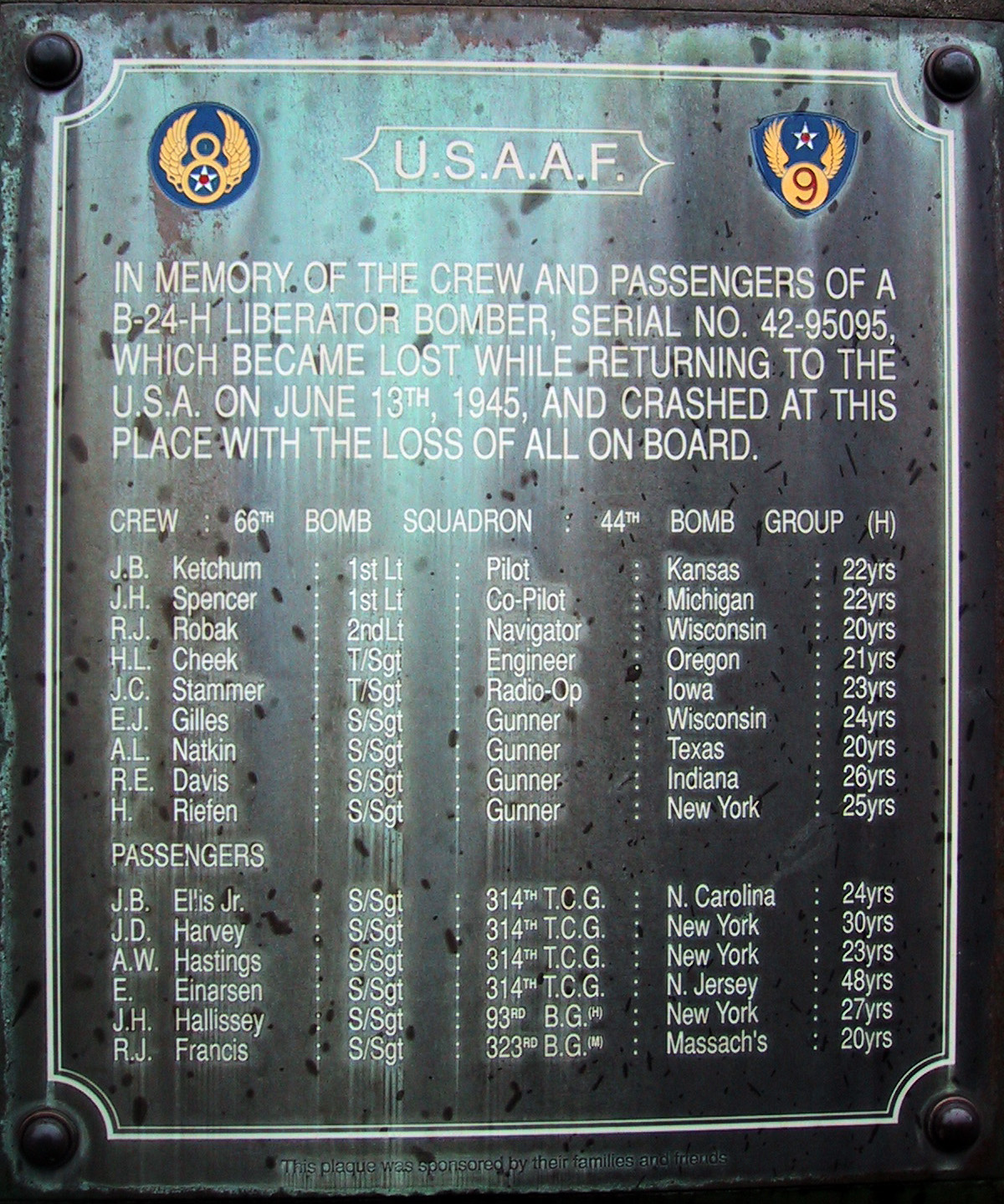
Memorial Plaque

Today much of the wreckage remains where the plane crashed. Pieces of fuselage lie in the bogs and a propeller and an engine can be seen protruding from the lochan. The area is classed as a war grave and visitors are expected not to disturb the wreckage. A memorial plaque, listing those who died, was erected by the families and friends of those killed.

The loss of the USAAF 42-95095 was not unique in this region, as other accidents involving military aircraft have taken place nearby. In 1951, an Avro Lancaster crashed on Beinn Eighe, a mountain near Slioch on the opposite shore of Loch Maree.
