= Charlestown, Wester Ross =

Hamlet in Highland, Scotland

Coordinates: 57.71075°N 5.67307°W

Charlestown
- Location within the Ross and Cromarty area
- OS grid reference: NG812749
- Council area: Highland
- Country: Scotland
- Sovereign state: United Kingdom
- Postcode district: IV21 2
- Police: Scotland
- Fire: Scottish
- Ambulance: Scottish

Charlestown is a small hamlet, making up one of the settlements which are collectively called Gairloch, and located 2 kilometres (1.2 mi) south of the main village of Gairloch, and overlooking the harbour area, on the west of Ross-shire, Scottish Highlands and is in the Scottish council area of Highland.
