= George McIver =

Scottish born Australian science fiction writer

- Born: 12 June 1859; Gairloch, Ross and Cromarty, Scotland
- Died: 1945 (aged 85–86); Parramatta, New South Wales
- Occupation: Novelist
- Writing career
- Literary movement: Science fiction

George McIver (12 June 1859 – 1945) was a Scottish born Australian science fiction writer.

In 1894 Neuroomia: A New Continent: A Manuscript Delivered from the Deep was published which offers an account of the discovery of a high-tech society of Martians who had been sent to earth due to overcrowding on Mars.
