= Melvaig =

Coordinates: 57.80883°N 5.794°W

Melvaig: Scottish Gaelic: Mealbhaig
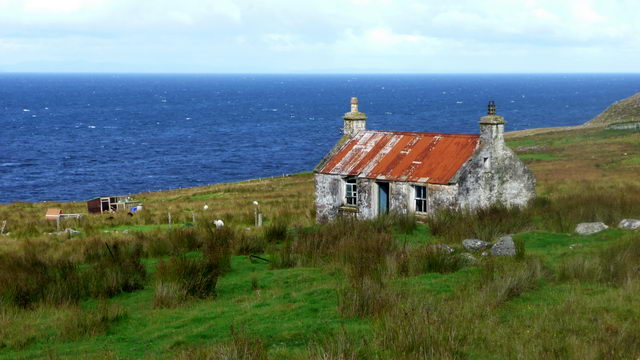
- Abandoned crofthouse in Melvaig

- Location within the Ross and Cromarty area
- OS grid reference: NG747862
- Council area: Highland
- Country: Scotland
- Sovereign state: United Kingdom
- Post town: Gairloch
- Postcode district: IV21 2
- Police: Scotland
- Fire: Scottish
- Ambulance: Scottish

Melvaig is a crofting township on the coast of western Ross-shire, Scottish Highlands and is in the Scottish council area of Highland. The houses are largely on a raised shoreline in Wester Ross and are scattered on the crofts into which the land was divided in 1846. While, in the past, the houses were closely linked to the associated crofts and the activities of crofting, nowadays many are detached from the crofts. Most of the crofts are used for sheep grazing by a small number of crofters with little or no growing of crops. The area is seen as attractive so houses that come on the market are bought usually by people from outwith the area. Some properties are holiday or second homes.

In the past, Melvaig along with Aultgrishan was served by a number of shops, a school, post office and mission houses but none of these operate today. The only service available in the area is a pillar box for post.

There is evidence of settlement dating back at least five centuries. Although it has a name derived from Norse, no evidence of settlement from Viking times is known. The village is accessed from Gairloch, which is 10 miles to the southeast.

It adjoins Aultgrishan, and the crofting village of North Erradale lies 4 miles to the south, along the coast road, with the village of Big Sand lying directly south. Melvaig is the final village at the north of the peninsula leading to Rua Reidh Lighthouse.

The Gaelic word for Melvaig is Mealabhaig meaning 'bent grass bay' or ‘sandy hillock covered overgrown with bent grass bay’ derived from Norse. The natural vegetation of the area is bent grass but there is no significant bay on this part of the coast.

In 1805, John M'Callum crashed his schooner full of herrings into the rocks a distance of one mile from the shores of Melvaig. All hands on deck perished save one. A Melvaig resident named John Smith stole the sea boots off of one of the bodies washed along the shore. A box containing 400 pounds was lost during the shipwreck and recovered by a resident, never to be returned.

By 1895, a boat slip was constructed by the government in the wrong location, this rendered the Dock useless for the local fishermen and had to be altered in later years after a parliamentary inquiry.

Melvaig has a long history of smuggling goods, with the many caves along the shoreline hidden by the diversion of streams which create waterfalls blocking view of the cavity. (Did this actually occur in this area?) Both the production and smuggling of alcohol was an important part of life for many residents, with many tactics of subterfuge.
