= Lonemore, Wester Ross =

Coordinates: 57.73054°N 5.71819°W

Lonemore: Scottish Gaelic: An Lòn Mòr
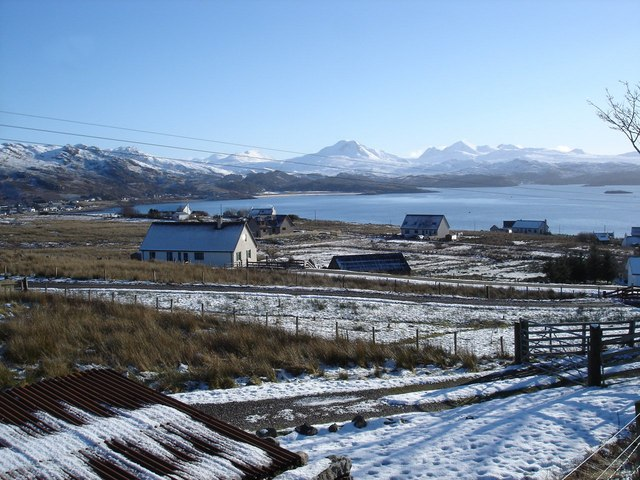
- Lonemore in early 2008 with Loch Gairloch beyond

- Location within the Ross and Cromarty area
- OS grid reference: NG787772
- Council area: Highland
- Country: Scotland
- Sovereign state: United Kingdom
- Postcode district: IV21 2
- Police: Scotland
- Fire: Scottish
- Ambulance: Scottish

Lonemore (Scottish Gaelic: An Lòn Mòr) is a crofting village on the north shore of Gair Loch near the village of Gairloch, Ross-shire, Scottish Highlands and is in the Scottish council area of Highland. Founded by Sir Francis Alexander Mackenzie, 5th Baronet (1798 - 1843) after his succession to the family title in 1826, by 1856 the village was a model of its kind in contrast to the devastation of the Clearances elsewhere.
