= Opinan, Gairloch =

Coordinates: 57.68539°N 5.78255°W

Opinan: Scottish Gaelic: Na h-Òbaidhnean
- Location within the Highland council area
- OS grid reference: NN486871
- Council area: Highland
- Country: Scotland
- Sovereign state: United Kingdom
- Postcode district: IV21 2
- Police: Scotland
- Fire: Scottish
- Ambulance: Scottish

Opinan (Scottish Gaelic: Na h-Òbaidhnean) is a fishing village on the west coast of Scotland in Gairloch, Ross-shire, Scottish Highlands and is in the Scottish council area of Highland.

The village of Port Henderson lies directly to the north.
