= Badachro =

Coordinates: 57.69738°N 5.72468°W

Badachro: Scottish Gaelic: Bad a' Chrò
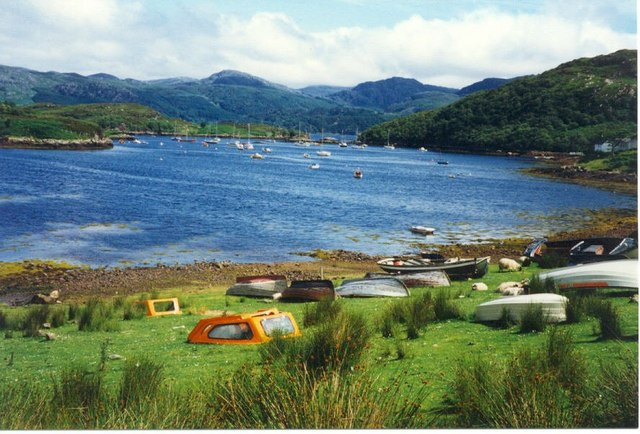
- Boats pulled up on the grass at Badachro

- Location within the Highland council area
- OS grid reference: NG781736
- Civil parish: Gairloch
- Council area: Highland
- Lieutenancy area: Ross and Cromarty
- Country: Scotland
- Sovereign state: United Kingdom
- Post town: GAIRLOCH
- Postcode district: IV21
- Dialling code: 01445
- Police: Scotland
- Fire: Scottish
- Ambulance: Scottish
- UK Parliament: Inverness, Skye and West Ross-shire
- Scottish Parliament: Ross, Skye and Inverness West

Badachro (Scottish Gaelic: Bad a' Chrò, meaning "the copse of the pen") is a former fishing village, in the northwest Highlands of Scotland.

== Geography ==
Badachro sits about 3 km south of Gairloch on the shore of Gair Loch, and is a natural harbour popular with yachts. The Fairy Lochs lie approximately 2 miles (3.2 km) to the south-east, and are the site of a 1945 plane crash which is now a designated war grave. The crash site has been preserved as a memorial to the USAAF servicemen who lost their lives in the accident and is accessible by a rough track near the Shieldaig Lodge Hotel.

Queen Victoria visited Shieldaig Lodge Hotel in 1877.

== Fishing ==
At the end of the nineteenth century, Badachro was a busy fishing village. Cod landed there and at Gairloch, and were dried at one of two curing stations at Badachro. Today, lobster, crab, and prawns are fished for markets south of the town.
