= North Erradale =

Coordinates: 57.75854°N 5.78602°W

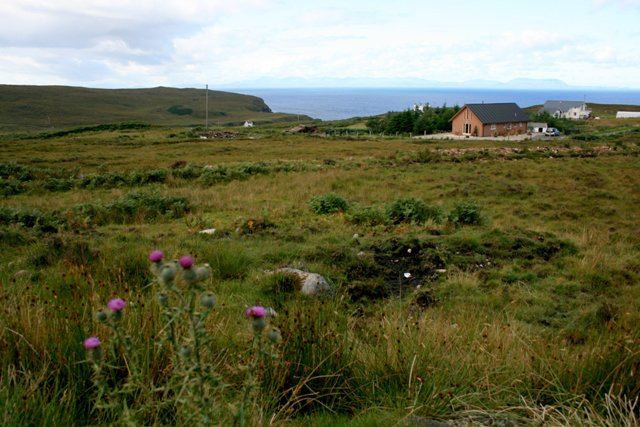

- Location within the Highland council area
- OS grid reference: NG748806
- Council area: Highland
- Country: Scotland
- Sovereign state: United Kingdom
- Post town: Gairloch
- Postcode district: IV21 2
- Police: Scotland
- Fire: Scottish
- Ambulance: Scottish

North Erradale is a remote coastal crofting village on the western coast of Ross-shire, Scottish Highlands and is in the Scottish council area of Highland.

The villages of Melvaig lies four miles (six kilometres) to the north, along the coast road, with the village of Big Sand lying directly south. Gairloch lies four to five miles (six to eight kilometres) to the southeast. The village dates back to the early 19th century, having houses dating back to the 1920s. It lies beside the Gairloch coast where there are many caves and ancient rocks.
