= Poolewe =

Coordinates: 57.765°N 5.604°W

Poolewe: Scottish Gaelic: Poll Iù
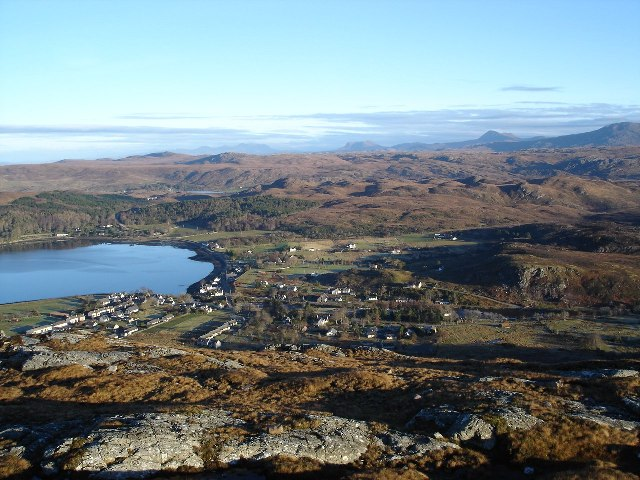
- View over Poolewe from Cliff Hill

- Location within the Ross and Cromarty area
- Population: 230
- OS grid reference: NG8580
- Civil parish: Gairloch
- Council area: Highland
- Lieutenancy area: Ross and Cromarty
- Country: Scotland
- Sovereign state: United Kingdom
- Post town: ACHNASHEEN
- Postcode district: IV22
- Dialling code: 01445
- Police: Scotland
- Fire: Scottish
- Ambulance: Scottish
- UK Parliament: Inverness, Skye and West Ross-shire
- Scottish Parliament: Caithness, Sutherland and Ross

Poolewe (/ˈpuːljuː/ POOL-yoo; Scottish Gaelic: Poll Iù) is a small village in Wester Ross in the North West Highlands of Scotland, about 75 miles (120 kilometres) northwest of Inverness, by Loch Ewe. The River Ewe, one of the shortest in Scotland, joins the sea less than one mile (1.5 kilometres) from Inverewe Garden, renowned for its subtropical plants. The village is surrounded by mountains and the sea.

The village has an indoor heated swimming pool, a coffee shop, a hotel and a shop. Most of the arts events in the area take place in the village hall, as do the village markets.

The town was an important port for the Arctic convoys of World War II bringing supplies to Soviet Union via the northern route.

Poolewe was the birthplace of Hector Urquhart, gamekeeper of Ardkinglas and collector of folktales, who in 1860 devised the adage in English that "one man's rubbish is another man's treasure,"or, as Americans may now say it, "one person's trash is another person's treasure."

== Origin of the name ==
Literally the name means "the pool on the Ewe river". William J. Watson, in his 1904 Place Names of Ross and Cromarty, records the name as "Abhainn Iù, Ewe River", which he suggests may be Irish or Pictish in origin.

== Climate ==
Poolewe has a mild climate for its latitude, due to the warm waters of the North Atlantic Drift. The Met Office operates a weather station at Poolewe for which 30-year averages are available. As with much of the British Isles and Scotland, Poolewe experiences a maritime climate with cool summers and mild winters, with snow lying only a few days per year. Its low-lying situation on the west coast tends to afford it some shelter from the harshness that can afflict the adjacent Highlands during the winter months.

The Northern Lights are visible on occasion, depending on the weather and time of year; most often in winter when skies are darkest.

Climate data for Poolewe, 6m asl, 1971–2000 (Extremes 1950–2014)
Month	Jan	Feb	Mar	Apr	May	Jun	Jul	Aug	Sep	Oct	Nov	Dec	Year
Record high °C (°F)	14.7 (58.5)	13.2 (55.8)	18.1 (64.6)	23.4 (74.1)	27.3 (81.1)	28.8 (83.8)	29.2 (84.6)	28.5 (83.3)	25.0 (77.0)	20.3 (68.5)	18.5 (65.3)	14.7 (58.5)	29.2 (84.6)
Mean daily maximum °C (°F)	7.1 (44.8)	7.5 (45.5)	8.7 (47.7)	10.9 (51.6)	14.3 (57.7)	15.9 (60.6)	17.5 (63.5)	17.5 (63.5)	15.1 (59.2)	12.4 (54.3)	9.2 (48.6)	7.6 (45.7)	11.3 (52.3)
Mean daily minimum °C (°F)	2.1 (35.8)	2.0 (35.6)	2.9 (37.2)	3.9 (39.0)	6.4 (43.5)	8.8 (47.8)	11.0 (51.8)	10.9 (51.6)	9.0 (48.2)	7.0 (44.6)	4.0 (39.2)	2.7 (36.9)	5.4 (41.7)
Record low °C (°F)	−9.5 (14.9)	−10.7 (12.7)	−9.6 (14.7)	−5.2 (22.6)	−2.8 (27.0)	−0.3 (31.5)	3.5 (38.3)	2.8 (37.0)	0.4 (32.7)	−6.3 (20.7)	−9.4 (15.1)	−11.5 (11.3)	−11.5 (11.3)
Mean monthly sunshine hours	24.3	62.2	95.9	144.2	177.0	148.8	127.1	128.8	94.7	69.6	32.3	16.0	1,120.9
Source: YR.NO

== Notable residents ==
In August 2015, the BBC genealogy documentary series Who Do You Think You Are? revealed that Donald Mackenzie, great-great-great-grandfather of celebrity chef Paul Hollywood, had been a crofter in Poolewe.

- Finlay MacKinnon (1863–1931), illustrator and watercolorist
- Hector Urquhart (fl. 1860), originator of the saying that "one man's rubbish is another man's treasure"

== Gallery ==
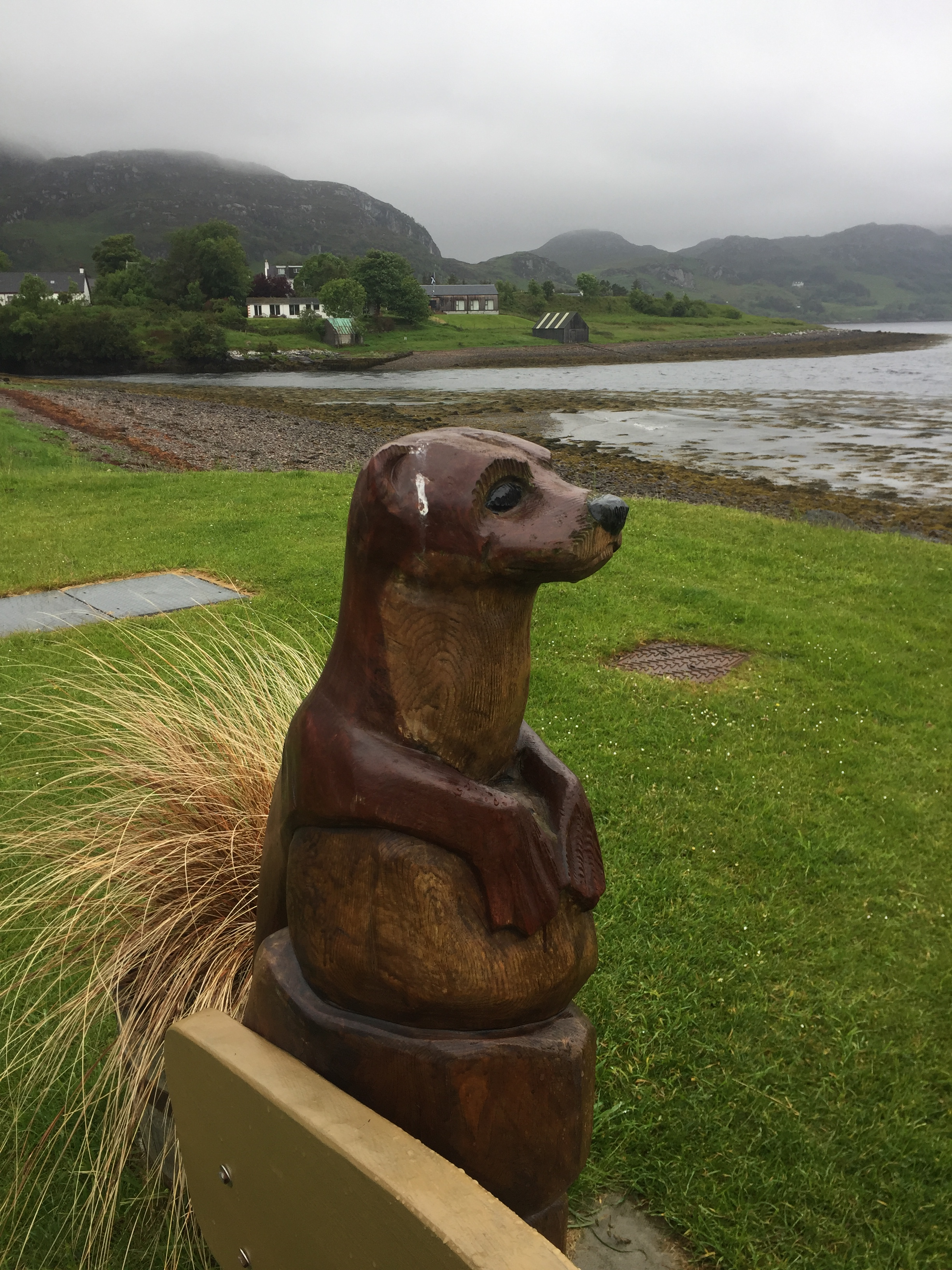
Seal statue

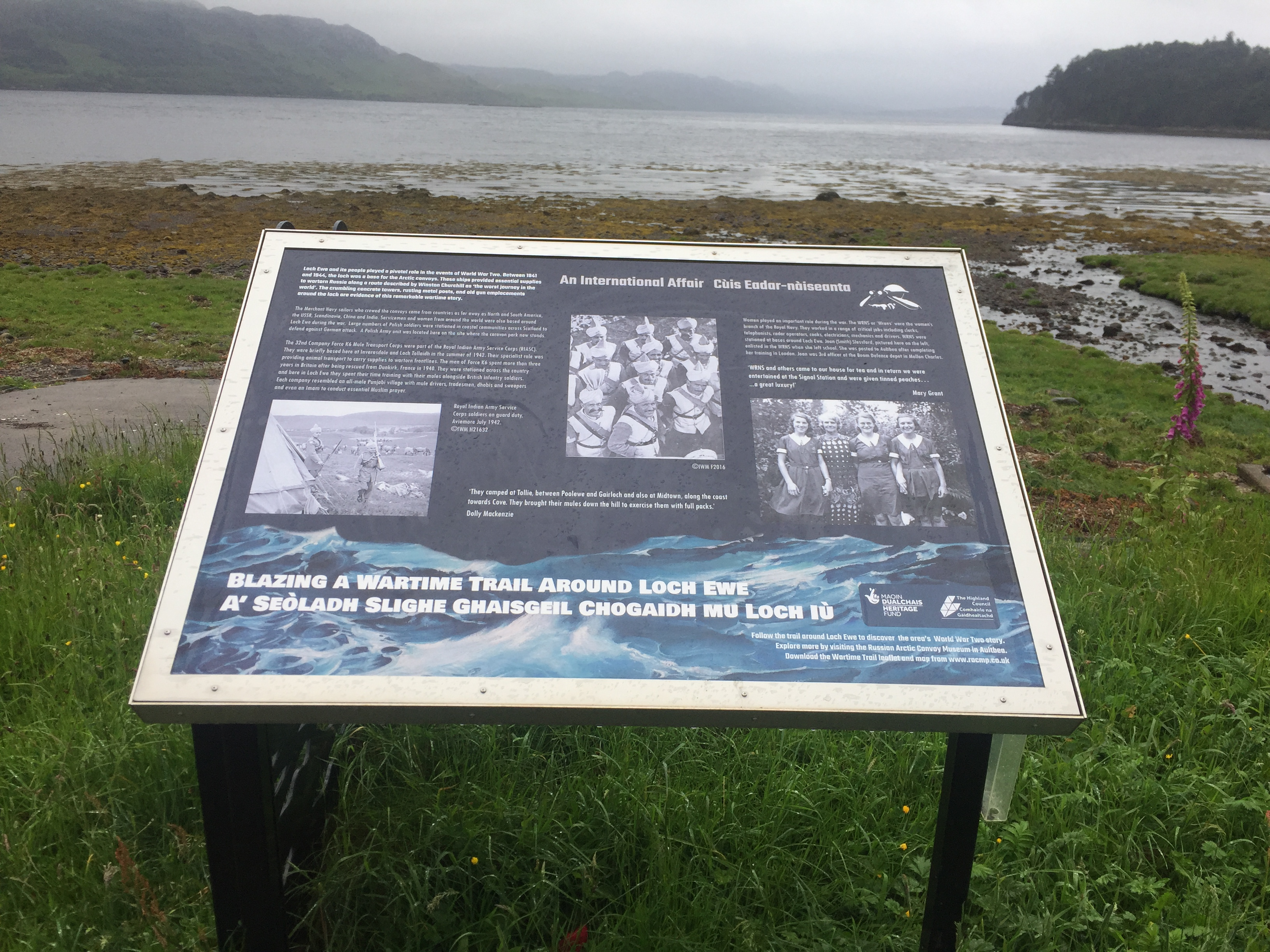
Arctic Convoy plaque

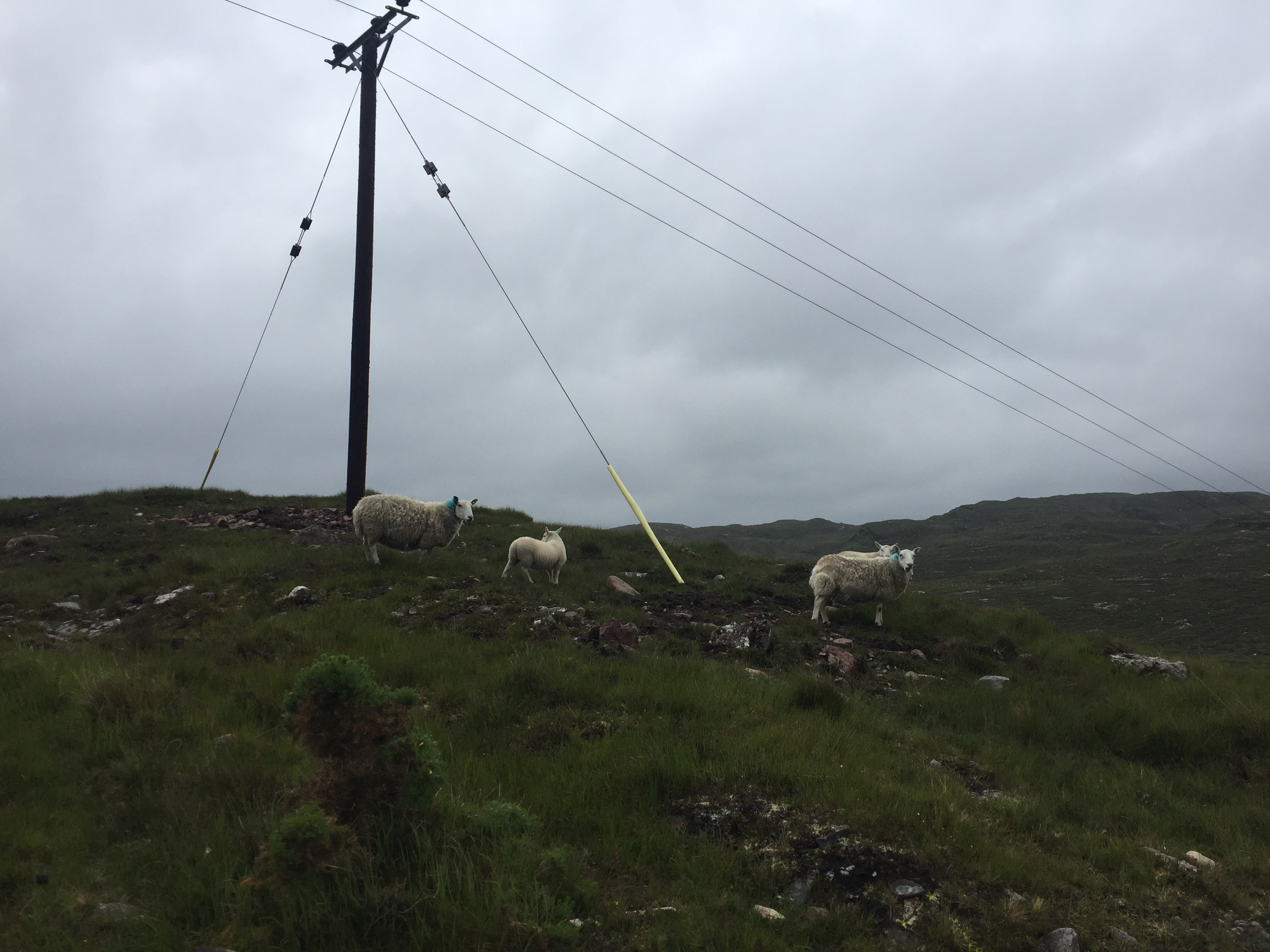
Sheep in Poolewe
