= Loch a' Ghobhainn =

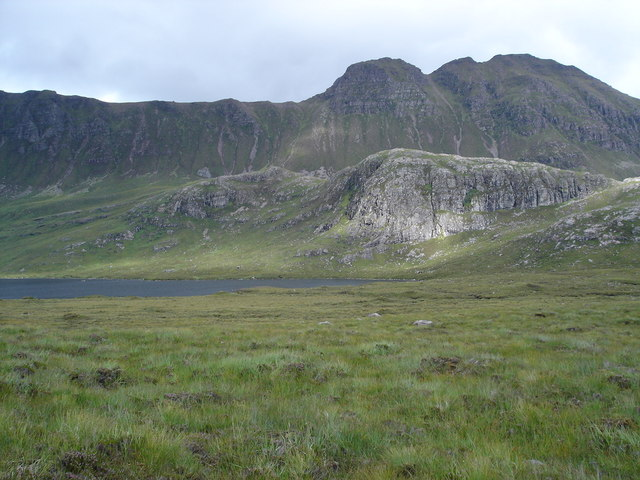

- Location within Highland
- Location: Wester Ross, Highland, Scotland
- Coordinates: 57.6305°N 5.5971°W
- Type: freshwater loch
- Basin countries: Scotland
- Max. length: 0.75 mi (1.21 km)
- Max. width: 0.3 mi (0.48 km)
- Surface area: 108.7 ha (269 acres)
- Average depth: 12.5 ft (3.8 m)
- Max. depth: 28 ft (8.5 m)
- Water volume: 54,000,000 ft^{3} (1,500,000 m^{3})
- Shore length^{1}: 3.1 km (1.9 mi)
- Surface elevation: 308 m (1,010 ft)
- Islands: 2
- ^{1} Shore length is not a well-defined measure.

Loch a' Ghobhainn is an upland freshwater loch lying inland and south west of the village of Shieldaig in the Scottish Highlands. The loch has an irregular, somewhat elliptical shape with a perimeter of 3.1 km (1.9 mi). It is approximately 0.75 mi (1.21 km) long, has an average depth of 12.5 ft (3.8 m) and is 28 ft (8.5 m) at its deepest. The loch was surveyed on 8 August 1902 by T.N. Johnston and John Hewitt and later charted as part of Sir John Murray's Bathymetrical Survey of Fresh-Water Lochs of Scotland 1897-1909.
