= Port Henderson =

Coordinates: 57.69763°N 5.76123°W

Port Henderson: Scottish Gaelic: Portaigil
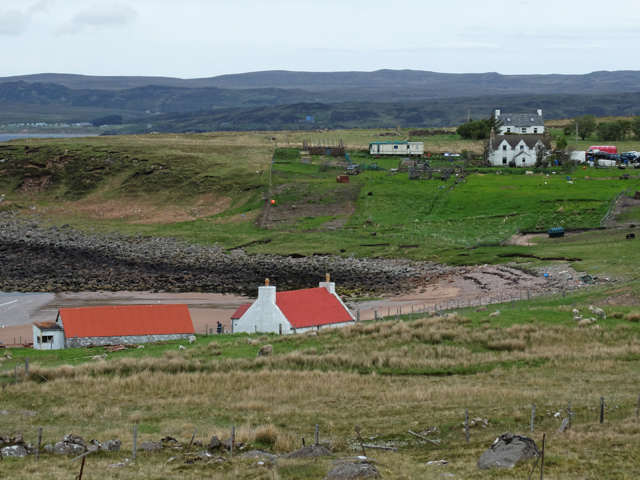

- Location within the Highland council area
- OS grid reference: NG759737
- Council area: Highland
- Country: Scotland
- Sovereign state: United Kingdom
- Postcode district: PH20 1
- Police: Scotland
- Fire: Scottish
- Ambulance: Scottish

Port Henderson (Scottish Gaelic: Portaigil) is a fishing village on the south west shore of the Gair Loch near the village of Gairloch, Ross-shire, Scottish Highlands and is in the Scottish council area of Highland. The fishing village was created by Hector Mackenzie as locally grown crops were not sufficient to feed the village population.

The villages of South Erradale and Opinan are located directly south from the village along the B8056 coast road.

== See also ==
- SS Arawa, a Scottish-built ocean liner renamed Port Henderson 1905 to 1912.
