= Rua Reidh Lighthouse =

Rua Reidh Lighthouse Rubha Reidh Rubh' Re
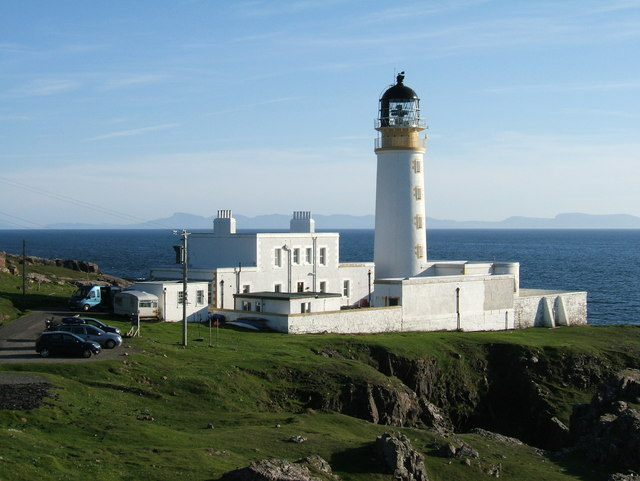
- Rua Reidh Lighthouse
- Location: Melvaig; Gairloch; Wester Ross; Scotland
- OS grid: NG7396491847
- Coordinates: 57°51′31.8″N 05°48′42.3″W

Tower
- Constructed: 1912
- Built by: David Alan Stevenson
- Construction: masonry tower
- Automated: 1986
- Height: 25 metres (82 ft)
- Shape: cylindrical tower with balcony and lantern attached to a 2-storey keeper's house
- Markings: white tower, black lantern, ochre trim
- Power source: mains electricity
- Operator: Rua Reidh Lighthouse
- Heritage: category B listed building
- Fog signal: deactivated in 1980

Light
- Focal height: 37 metres (121 ft)
- Lens: hyperradiant Fresnel lens
- Intensity: 520,000 candela
- Range: 24 nautical miles (44 km; 28 mi)
- Characteristic: Fl (4) W 15s.

Rua Reidh Lighthouse stands close to the entrance to Loch Ewe in Wester Ross, Scotland.

== History ==
The name "Rua Reidh" is a semi-anglicisation of "Rubha Rèidh" meaning a flat headland.

A lighthouse on Rubh'Re Point was first proposed by David Stevenson in 1853. Building was started by his son, David Alan Stevenson, in 1908 and the light was first lit on 15 January 1912. The light came from a paraffin lamp, subsequently converted to electricity. The original Fresnel lens is now in the nearby Gairloch Heritage Museum. The fog siren gave 4 blasts every 90 seconds. The fog siren was discontinued in 1980 as well as all the fog sirens in Scotland. The red fog siren trumpet, along with its clockwork timing mechanism were removed and were donated to the Gairloch heritage center and put on display. The siren's tower and engine room were partially demolished. All that is left is the first floor of the siren's tower and the front facade of the engine room. The fog signal equipment was auctioned off and the pressurised air tanks were removed and sold for scrap.

To the north, a quay and ramp provided access from the sea at high tide. This was the only access for supplies until the road from Gairloch was built in 1962 and can still be seen. This new road was first satisfyingly driven on by Iain Bain (1922–2011). Paraffin was pumped from the quay and other goods were transported on a small trolley on rails.

In recent years the road has been the subject of an access dispute, as the operators of the Bed and Breakfast operating at the site have erected barriers and challenged drivers on the road. The local council maintain that there is a public right of access along the road, and are seeking to resolve the situation, and claim that attempts to resolve the situation amicably have been met with intransigence and aggression on the part of the owners.

== Lighthouse buildings ==
Since automation of the light in 1986, the adjacent accommodation is no longer required for keepers and was sold into private ownership. Since 2004 the lighthouse has been protected as a category B listed building. Several of the outbuildings have since been in use as Bed and breakfast and self-catering tourist accommodation.

== Wildlife ==
The sea around the point contains basking sharks and Atlantic seals. fulmars, European shags and kittiwakes nest on the steep cliffs.

== See also ==
- List of lighthouses in Scotland
- List of Northern Lighthouse Board lighthouses
