= Big Sand =

Coordinates: 57.74°N 05.78°W

Big Sand: Scottish Gaelic: Sannda Mhòr
- Location within the Highland council area
- OS grid reference: NG7579
- Council area: Highland
- Country: Scotland
- Sovereign state: United Kingdom
- Police: Scotland
- Fire: Scottish
- Ambulance: Scottish

Big Sand (Scottish Gaelic: Sannda Mhòr) is a small remote crofting village in Highland, Scotland. It is situated on the shores of the Gair Loch and is 3 1/2 miles (5.5 kilometres) from Gairloch village. As the name suggests it is situated beside a large, unspoiled beach. Longa Island, a small uninhabited island, is easily visible.

The crofting village of North Erradale lies 1 mile (1.6 kilometres) northwest of Big Sand, along the coast road, with the village of Melvaig located 4 to 5 miles (6 to 8 kilometres) further north of North Erradale.

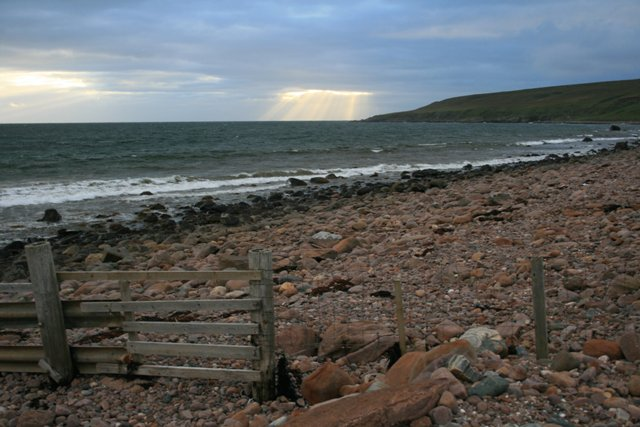
Stony beach at Big Sand, the sandy beach lies just south of here

== Transportation ==
The B8021 road links Big Sand to Gairloch and also North Erradale and Malvaig.

== Tourism ==
Nearby is a popular campsite for tourists.
