= Inverasdale =

Coordinates: 57.80318°N 5.66789°W

Inverasdale: Scottish Gaelic: Inbhir Àsdail
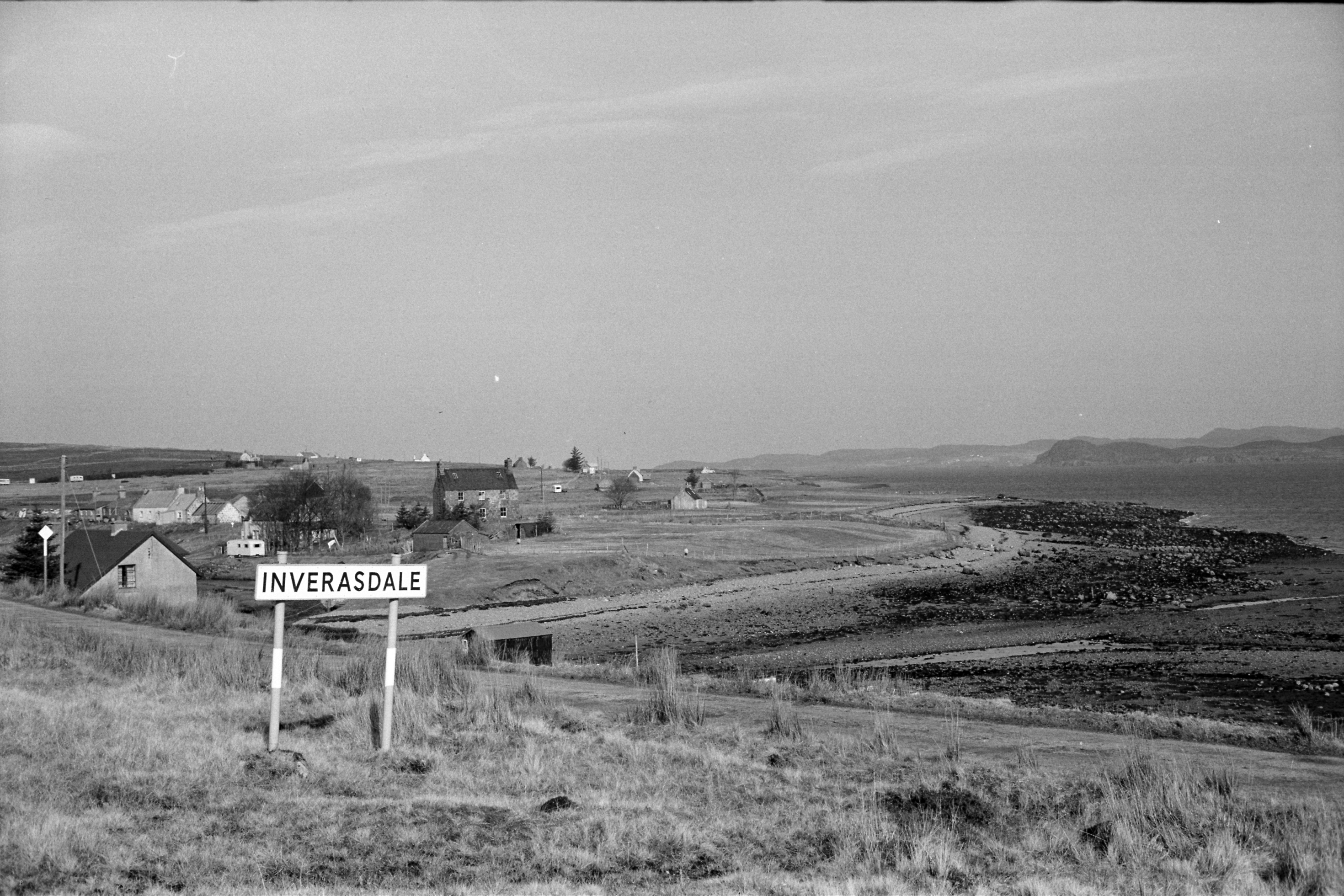
- Inverasdale (1974)

- Location within the Ross and Cromarty area
- OS grid reference: NG820862
- Council area: Highland
- Lieutenancy area: Ross and Cromarty
- Country: Scotland
- Sovereign state: United Kingdom
- Postcode district: IV22
- Police: Scotland
- Fire: Scottish
- Ambulance: Scottish
- UK Parliament: Ross, Skye and Lochaber
- Scottish Parliament: Caithness, Sutherland and Ross

Inverasdale (Scottish Gaelic: Inbhir Àsdail) is a hamlet in the Northwest Highlands of Scotland, located by Loch Ewe, in the region of Wester Ross.

== Inverasdale Primary School ==
In 2012 Inverasdale Primary School was "mothballed" after service to the community since 1876.

In 2015 it was announced that Inverasdale Primary School would close permanently due to a shortage of pupils.

The old school building was the temporary home of the Arctic Convoys exhibition. It is now run as a community hub and tea room by the Wester Loch Ewe Trust.

More information about the history of Inverasdale can be accessed in the archives of Gairloch Heritage Museum.

== Notable Individuals ==
Kay Matheson was born in Inverasdale in 1928. In 1950 she was part of the Removal of the Stone of Scone from Westminster Abbey. The police visited Inverasdale while looking for the stone.

Aonghas “Bear” MacIver- Part of the famous Ross Sutherland Scottish rugby national bowl winning Side in 2018 and decorated all rounded prop.
