= Gairloch Museum =

Museum in Gairloch, Scotland

Coordinates: 57.7284°N 5.6905°W

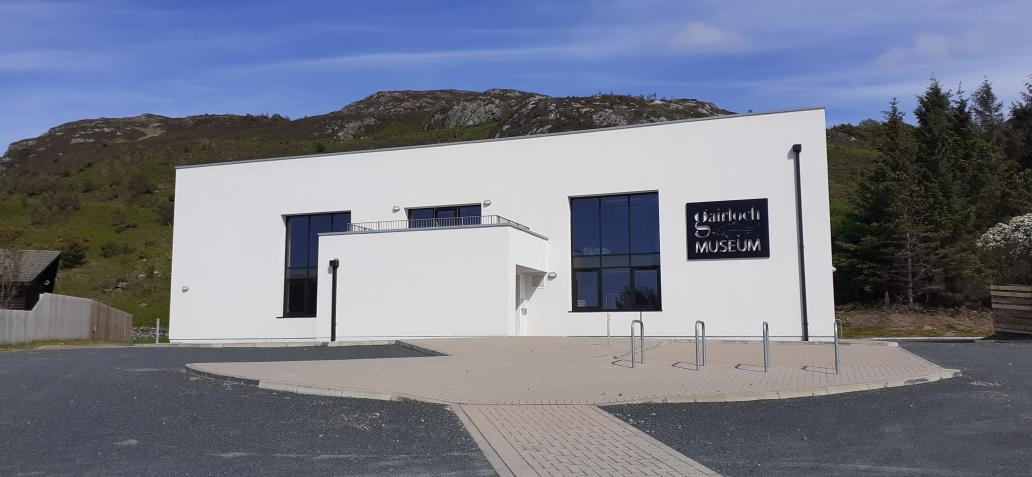
Gairloch Museum

Gairloch Museum (Scottish Gaelic: Taigh-tasgaidh Gheàrrloch) is an independent museum in the Wester Ross region of Scotland. The museum is located in the Highland village of Gairloch, in Achtercairn. The museum moved to a new site in 2019- a former Cold War building that had been converted to house exhibitions. The following year the museum was named one of the five winners of the 2020 ArtFund Museum of the Year Award.

== History ==
The museum opened in 1977, with the organisation set up as local branch of the Ross and Cromarty Heritage Society. This came about through the efforts of Sylvia Murdoch, her husband Morton Murdoch and others, such as Kay Matheson. This would later become the Gairloch & District Heritage Society and then the Gairloch & District Heritage Company Ltd.

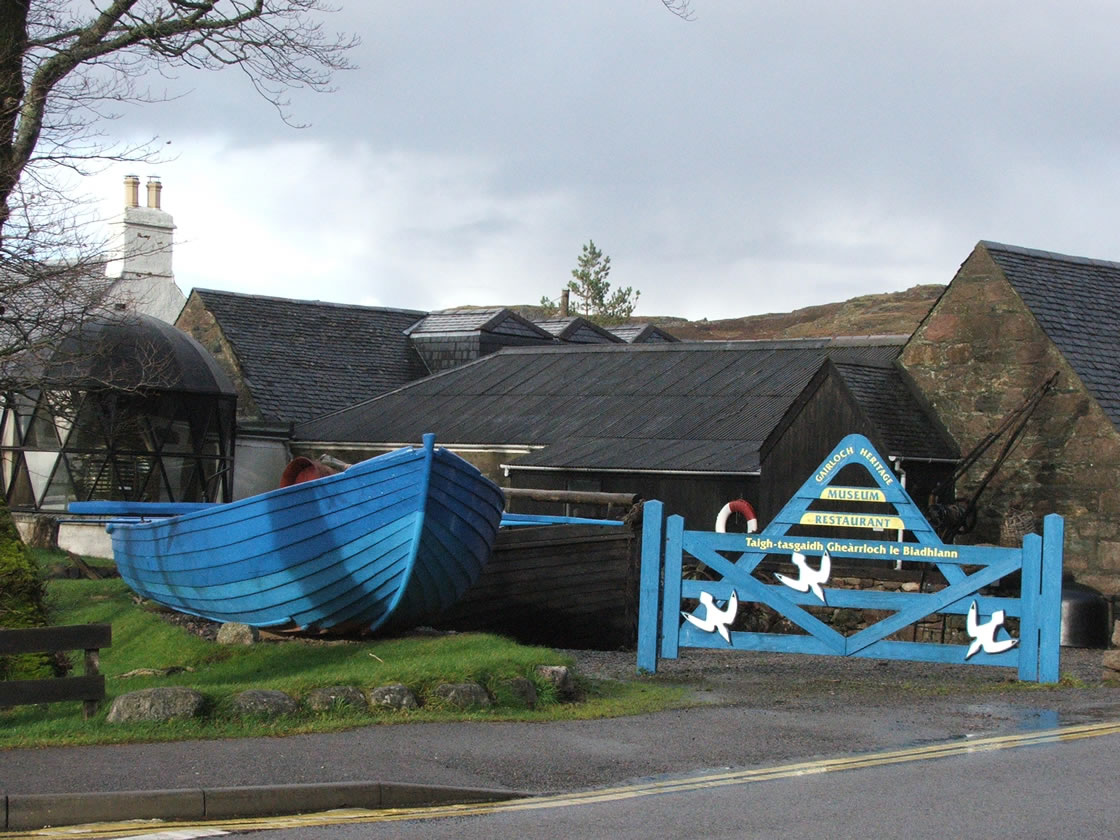
The former Gairloch Heritage Museum from the A832

They applied and were successful in converting part of the existing farm steading in Achtercairn to form a heritage museum and clubs rooms for members during the winter months for lectures and films, among others. The year later they applied and were successful in converting the second wing of farm steading to extend the museum as the current building was too small to house the exhibits. The library extension was added in 1987 and an extension for the Rudha Reidh lighthouse lens in 1988.

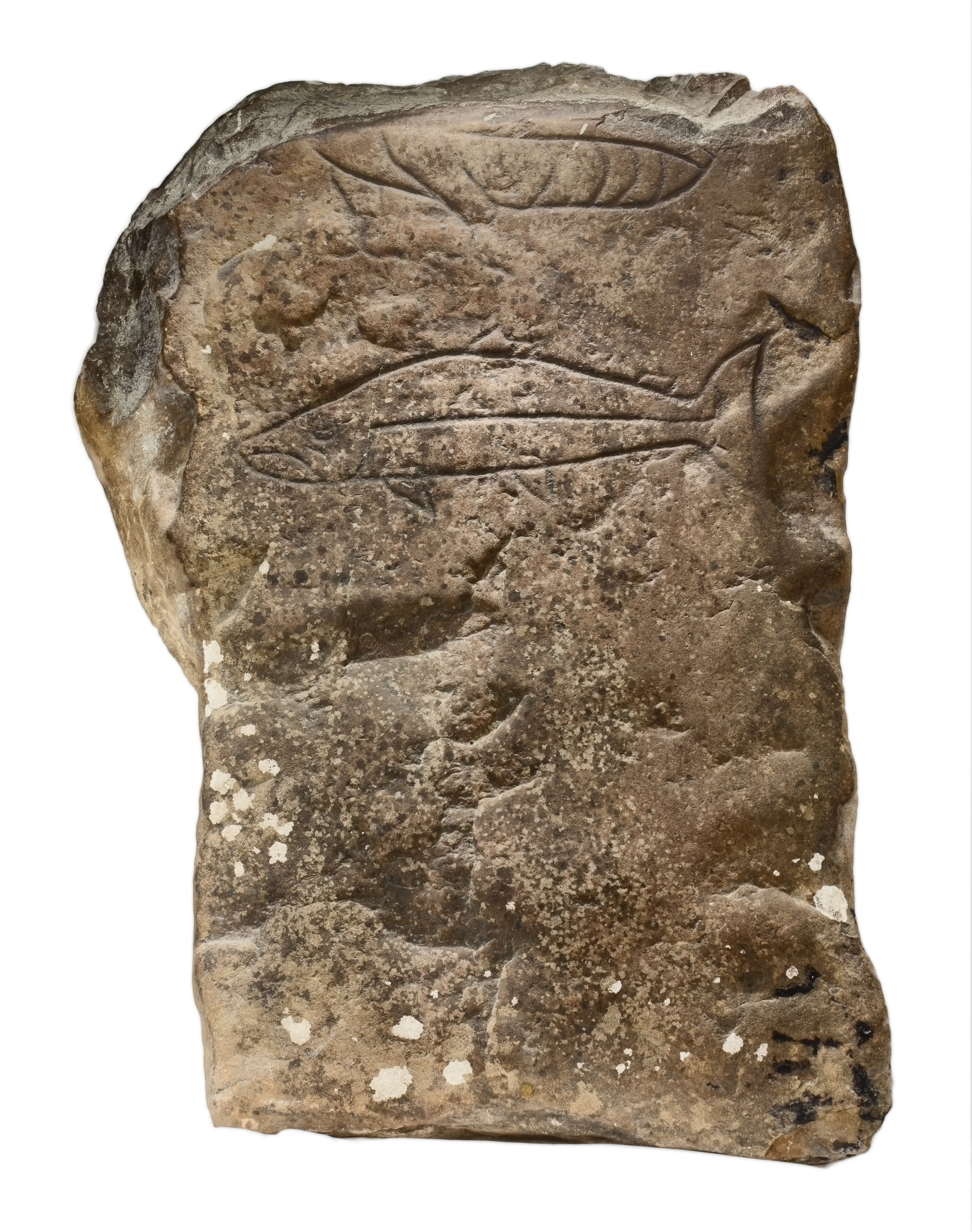
A photograph of the ancient Pictish Stone found at the museum

The museum was created due to concern of possible damage to the growing collection of artefacts that had been donated by local people such as the Gairloch Stone, a Class I Pictish Stone and thus they investigated means to protect it. The company wanted to provide a wet weather facility for tourists for them to appreciate aspects of Gairloch's past. Members of the company were interested in displaying objects relating to archaeology, farming, fishing, and domestic utensils, among others; those that showed the history of the West Coast.

In December 2016 the Gairloch Heritage Museum secured a £725,600 grant from Heritage Lottery Fund to transform a nearby building that they could relocate to. The former Cold War building had been built in the 1950s as a military bunker to act as an anti-aircraft operations outpost, and latterly had been used as a roads maintenance depot. Completion of the project relied upon the Heritage Lottery Fund grant in combination with public and private sector trusts and community fundraising efforts. The museum board and volunteers raised £2.4 million to complete the project. Building work began in February 2018. While interior walls were removed and windows introduced to two foot thick walls, some features of that period were retained, such as the heavy blast doors.

The newly rebranded Gairloch Museum was officially opened on 9 July 2019 by the Princess Royal.

In October 2020, Gairloch Museum was named one of the five winners of the 2020 ArtFund Museum of the Year Award. ArtFund increased the prize money to £200,000 and changed the format of the award to five winners in response to the challenges faced by the museum sector during the Coronavirus Pandemic.

== Displays and exhibitions ==
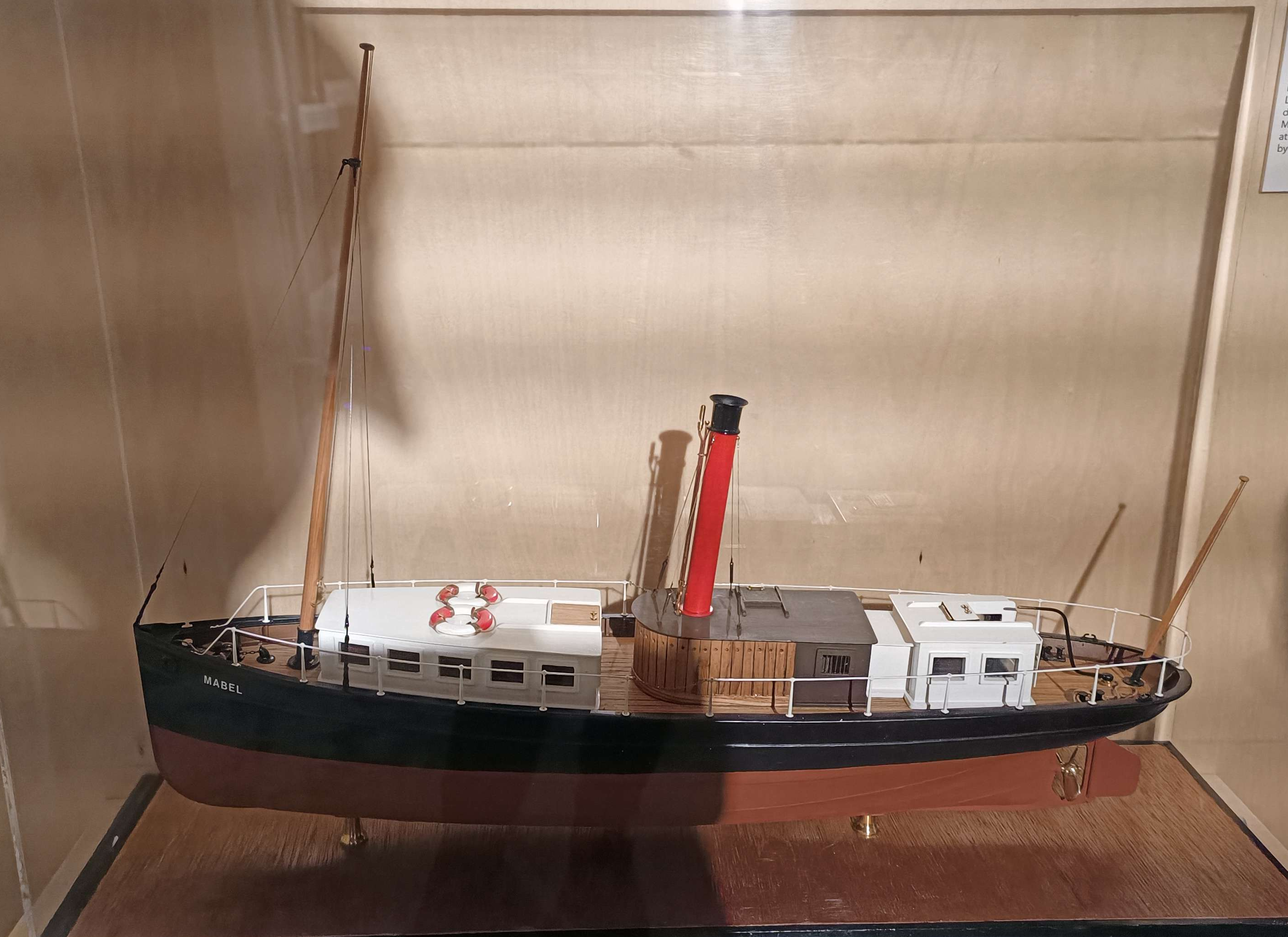
SS Mabel

The museum contains various displays and exhibitions which focus on the culture and social history of Gairloch parish. Displays include:

- The Poolewe Hoard - a rare Early Iron Age bronze hoard found in Poolewe
- The original Hyperradiant Fresnel lens from nearby Rua Reidh Lighthouse
- A Replica croft house from over 100 years ago
- An ancient Pictish stone - the first and one of very few found on the West Coast of Scotland
- Interactive displays on the natural history of the area.
