= Gairloch =

Coordinates: 57°43′41″N 5°41′28″W

Gairloch: Scottish Gaelic: Geàrrloch
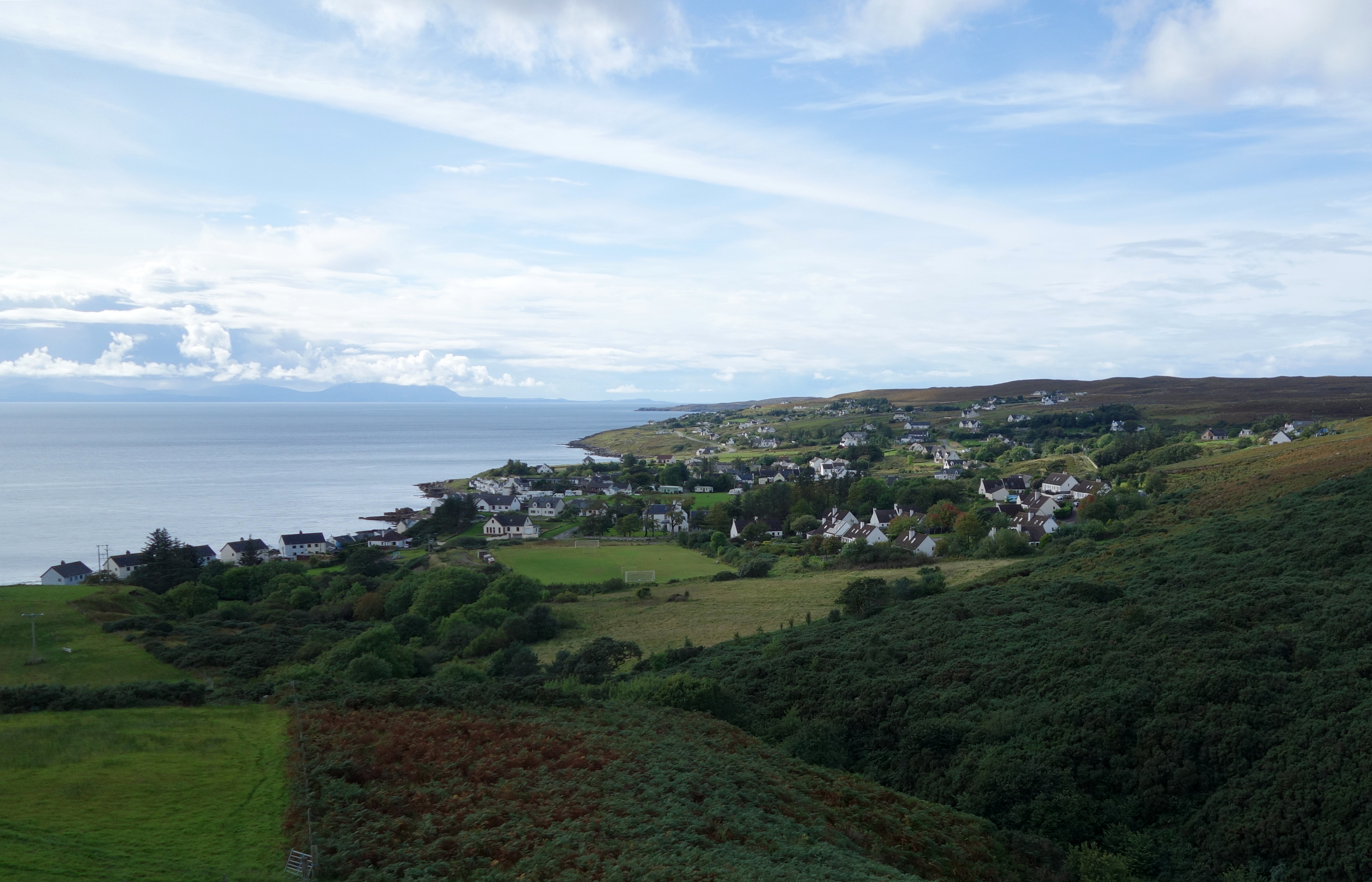
- View towards Strath

- Location within the Ross and Cromarty area
- Population: 610 (2020)
- OS grid reference: NG803769
  - Edinburgh: 155 mi (249 km)
  - London: 484 mi (779 km)
- Civil parish: Gairloch
- Council area: Highland
- Lieutenancy area: Ross and Cromarty
- Country: Scotland
- Sovereign state: United Kingdom
- Post town: GAIRLOCH
- Postcode district: IV21
- Dialling code: 01445
- Police: Scotland
- Fire: Scottish
- Ambulance: Scottish
- UK Parliament: Inverness, Skye and West Ross-shire
- Scottish Parliament: Caithness, Sutherland and Ross

Gairloch (/ˈɡɛərlɒx/ GAIR-lokh; Scottish Gaelic: Geàrrloch [ˈkʲaːrˠl̪ˠɔx], meaning "Short Loch") is a village, civil parish and community on the shores of Loch Gairloch in Wester Ross, in the North-West Highlands of Scotland. A tourist destination in the summer months, Gairloch has a golf course, a museum, several hotels, a variety of shops, takeaway restaurants, a community centre, a leisure centre with sports facilities, a local newspaper "Gairloch and District Times", radio station (Radio Wester Ross), beaches and nearby mountains. Gairloch is one of the principal villages on the North Coast 500 route.

The parish of Gairloch extends over a much wider area, including the villages of Poolewe, Kinlochewe and Aultbea, and has a population of 950. The nearest railway station is located at Achnasheen, and the nearest mainland airport is in Inverness.

== Geography ==
Gairloch is a loosely defined area of settlement along the shores of Loch Gairloch but primarily comprises three main clusters of shops, houses and amenities: the Harbour area (including Charlestown on the south side of the harbour), Achtercairn and Strath. Approaching from the south (on the A832 road via Kinlochewe), the B8056 turning for Badachro, Port Henderson and other settlements on the south side of the loch leaves left from the main road over a narrow 'hump-backed' bridge.

Continuing north on the A832 towards the Charlestown and the harbour are the first settlements of central Gairloch to be met. About 1 mile (1.5 kilometres) further north, Achtercairn is centred on the road junction with the B8021 coastal road that leads west along the north shore of the loch to Strath and on towards Melvaig on the west coast. The main A832 road leaves Gairloch, heading steeply up Achtercairn Brae leading out of the village to the north and on to Poolewe.

The coastal climate is affected by the Gulf Stream, bringing relatively warm waters in summer. These warm waters are ideal for jellyfish which can swarm the local waters, although most species in the UK are harmless.

Following a community campaign against proposals by Scottish Water to replace the existing treatment works at Fhasaich and discharge minimally treated sewage effluent into the loch, the main Gairloch beach (Gaineabh Mhòr) and the Sands beach were given Designated Bathing Waters status for 2017, and Scottish Water was asked to revise its plans to take account of the need to maintain higher standards of seawater cleanliness in the area. In autumn 2017 it proposed additional filtering and sterilization of the effluent, but only during the peak bathing season in the summer, with basic septic tank treatment for the rest of the year.

Beyond Gairloch to the northwest, several small settlements can be found: Big Sand, North Erradale, and Melvaig. North of Sands campsite, the road becomes single-track for 6 miles (10 kilometres) to Melvaig. Beyond Melvaig the road narrows to a 3-mile (5-kilometre) private stretch (which is open to the public and has right of passage for cars) and ends close to the Rua Reidh Lighthouse. There is a small local authority car park in Melvaig for five cars where people park to walk out to the Lighthouse.

== Land ownership ==
The lands around Gairloch have been mostly in the ownership of the Mackenzies of Gairloch since the 15th century, when they were acquired by Hector Roy Mackenzie (died 1528), with a family house in the sheltered glen of Flowerdale. The Mackenzies were clan leaders in the traditional sense and were known for their attachment to their tenants. During the 19th century, Sir Hector Mackenzie and his sons Sir Francis and Dr John Mackenzie refused to evict a single tenant during the clearances, despite the estate running at a loss. As a result, evicted Highlanders from other communities came to live in the area which has caused Gairloch to maintain a thriving community even today. The glen has a microclimate and vegetation that are home to a diverse range of natural life. Christina Byam Shaw states in her memoir Pigeonholes of Memory, that her father was able to grow fruiting peaches outdoors. Osgood Mackenzie created the Inverewe Garden in nearby Poolewe. There is a walk up the Flowerdale burn, going past the Mackenzie house, Tigh Digh, to a waterfall at the head of the glen. With the aid of public grants, new and refurbished footpaths have been established which allow residents and visitors to access the wooded areas, however access to the popular Cherry Tree Hill walk has been obstructed by the estate in 2024. The Estate has also developed several micro hydroelectric schemes to generate additional income.

== Fishing ==
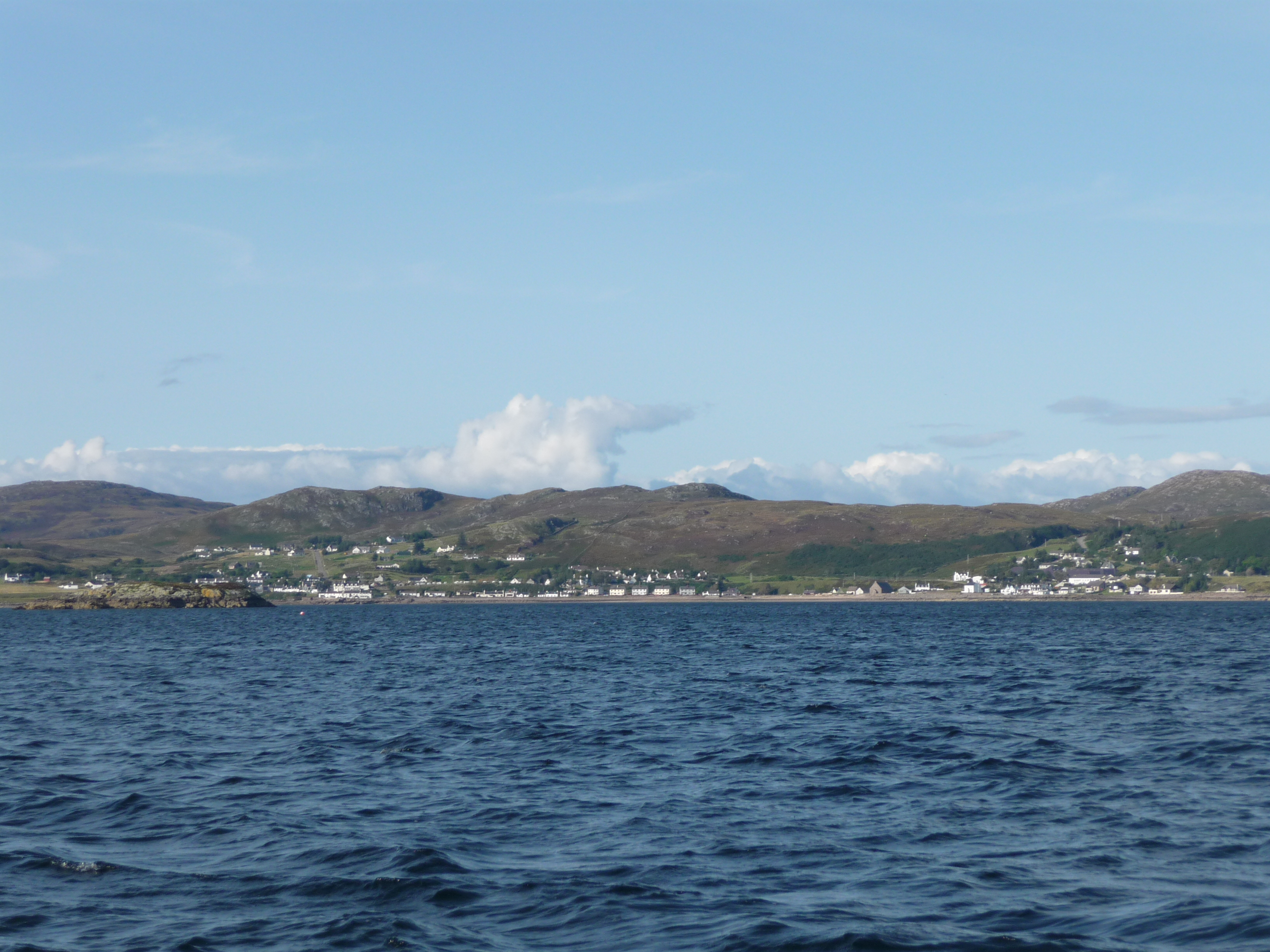
View from the "overside" of Gairloch

Gairloch and nearby Badachro on the south side (the "overside") have a history of creel shellfish fishing as well as small-scale trawl fishing. The number of active boats has been in decline, however, and Gairloch has seen both of its shellfish processing businesses fall by the wayside over the last 10 years. There are still a few fishermen who work regularly for their living, but many have moved on; some have diversified into catering for tourism and visitor activities.

Boat fishing and marine wildlife trips can be arranged at the harbour, and there are many hill lochs in the area with trout fishing available. Trips are also available with a working creel boat based in Badachro.

== Amenities and tourism ==
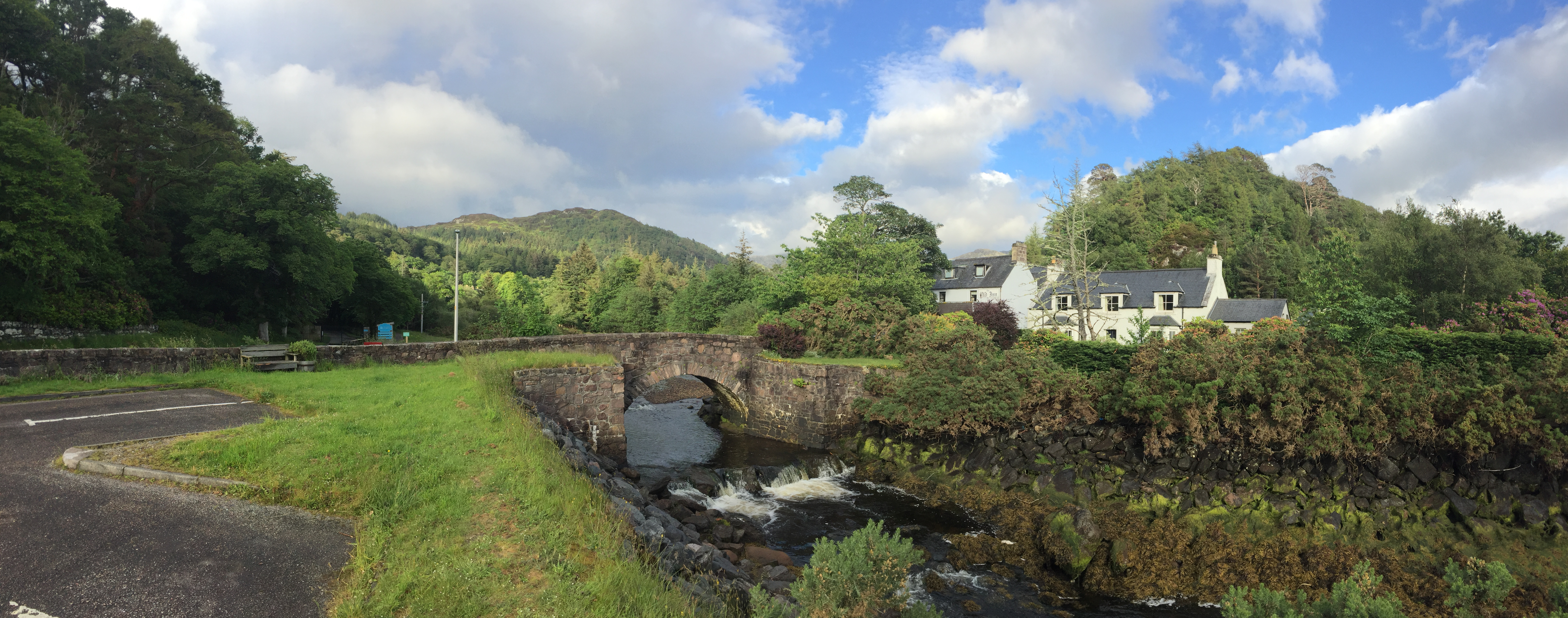
Panoramic view of The Old Inn at Gairloch

Shops are to be found in Strath, Achtercairn and Pier Road at the harbour. Also in the harbour area, near the golf course is a branch of the Bank of Scotland which has limited opening hours. A mobile Royal Bank of Scotland also visits the area weekly. Post Offices are located in local convenience stores at the harbour and in Achtercairn. Public services such as police station, leisure centre, schools, library and health centre, as well as a small supermarket and a home and garden centre, are in the central Achtercairn area. A small water sports centre, Gairloch Kayak Centre, is based at Shieldaig Lodge Hotel.

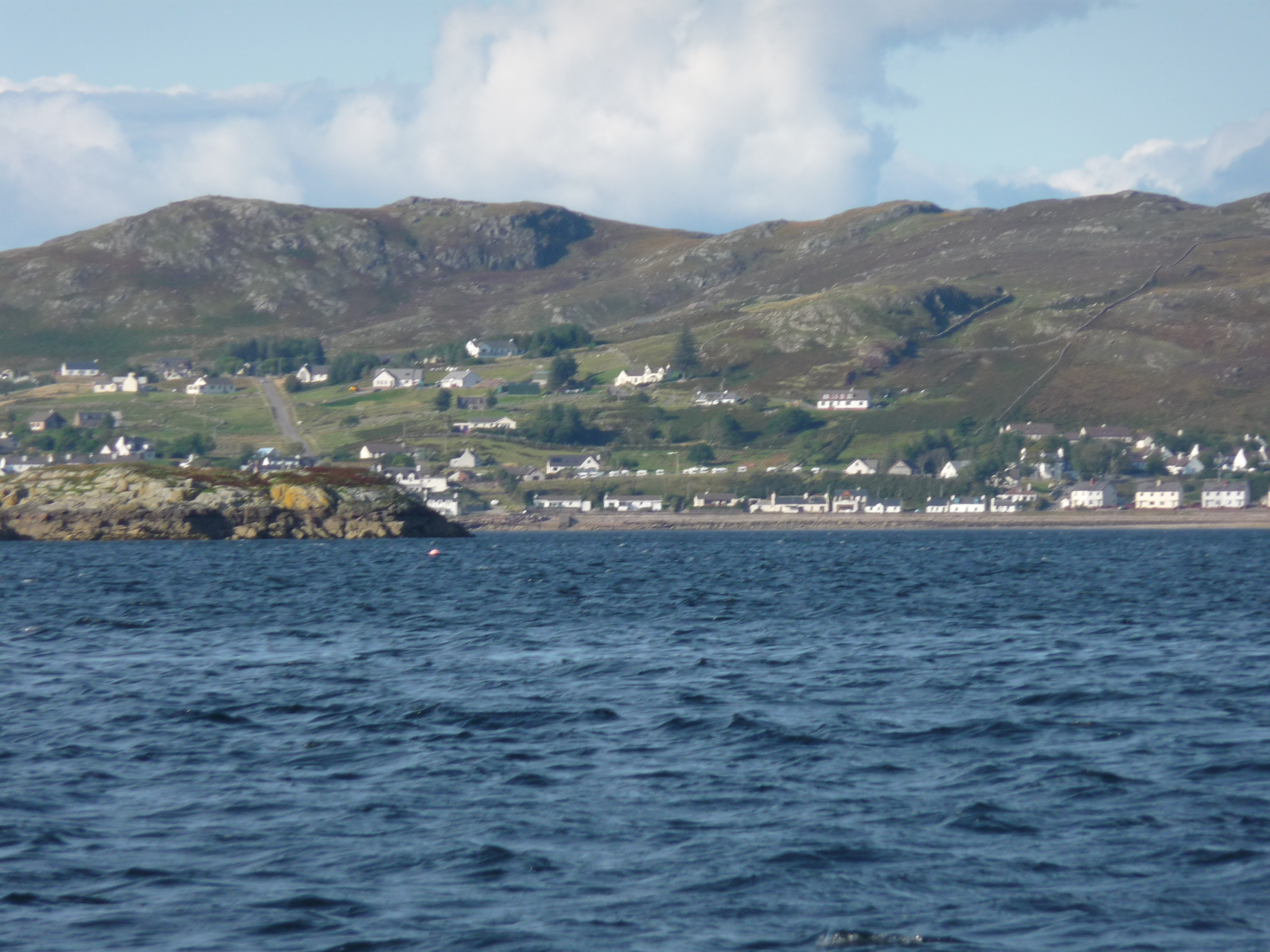
Centre of Gairloch

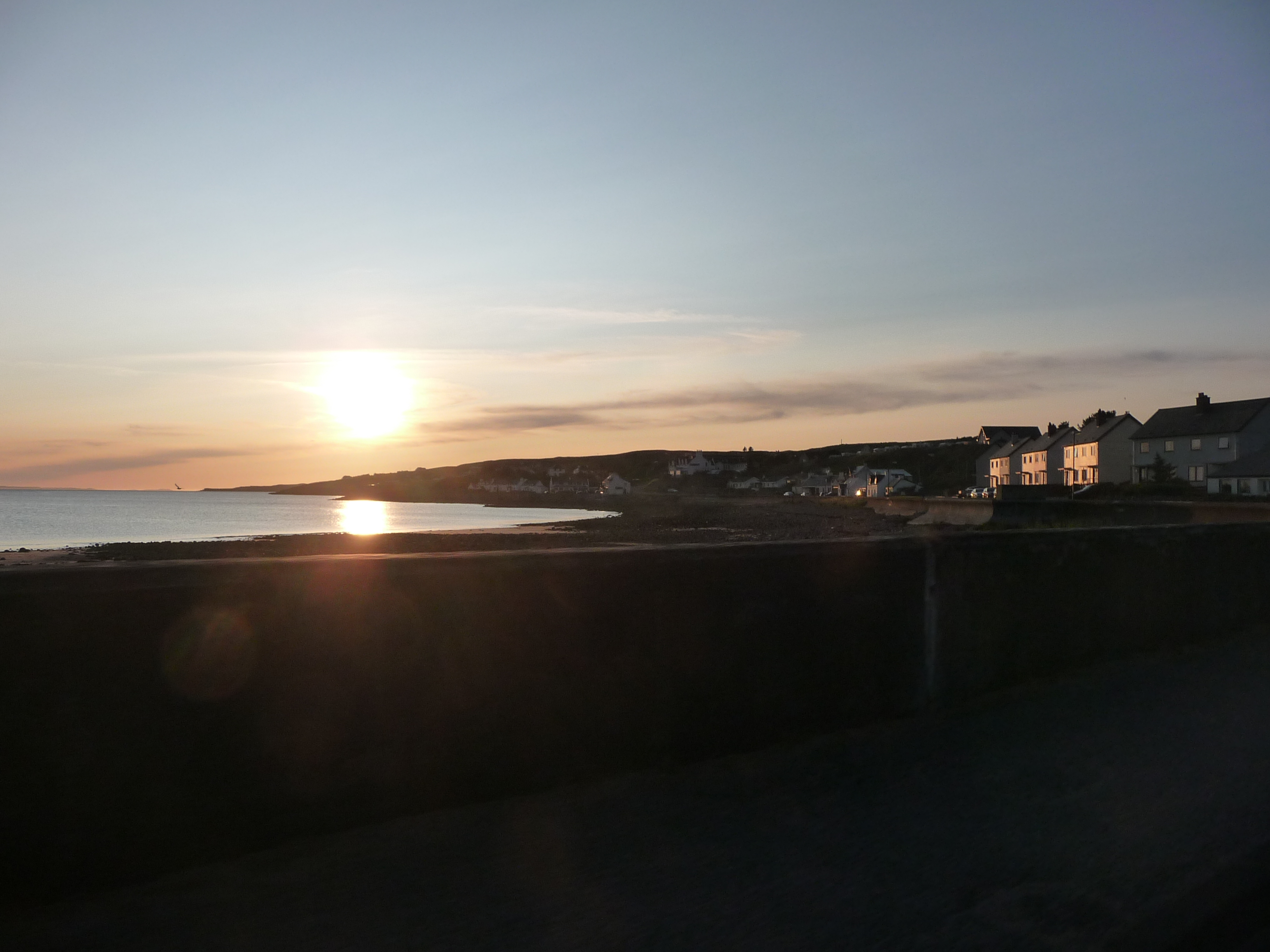
Sunset over the Strath area of Gairloch

There is a tourist information service, a 24-hour filling station (card payment out of hours), and dual electric vehicle charging points are at the Gairloch Community Hall and in the Pier Road car park.

Two campsites take tents, caravans and motorhomes – one in Strath, Gairloch Holiday Park, and one to the west of Gairloch on Little Sand Farm, Sands Caravan & Camping. Carn Dearg Youth Hostel, situated on the headland shortly before Sand, has views across the bay towards Skye. Overnight stays by recreational vehicles are permitted in the Pier Road car park. A free 24-hour chemical toilet emptying point is available beside the public toilet building in the harbour.

A Pictish stone, with a distinctive carving of a salmon, was found in Gairloch in 1880. This is one of the westernmost sites where such a discovery has been made. The stone is now on display in the Gairloch Heritage Museum. From 2013 to 2017 raised funds for a major project to relocate to a new home in the former Cold War Anti-Aircraft Operations Room building in Achtercairn. The museum reopened in the new building in July 2019 with expanded exhibits as well as a gallery and shop featuring work by local artists.

The site of a 1945 plane crash at the Fairy Lochs near Gairloch is now a designated war grave. The hilltop crash site, south of the road to Badachro, has been preserved as a memorial to the USAAF servicemen who lost their lives in the accident.

There is a single public bus service to and from Inverness on Monday, Tuesday, Friday and Saturday, plus once-a-week services to Ullapool and Dingwall.

== Education ==
Early years, primary, secondary and further education are provided at the education campus in the central Achtercairn area. Gairloch Primary School provides both Gaelic and English medium learning and has an approximate roll of 75. Gairloch High School is a modern six-year secondary school with an approximate roll of 160. A limited range of further education courses is provided by the West Highland College UHI, part of the University of the Highlands and Islands.

== Media ==
The Gairloch and District Times has been produced in the village since 1978.

Gairloch is home to the UK's smallest local radio station, Radio Wester Ross.

The village was featured on the BBC One TV series When Love Comes to Town in 2007.

The area has also been featured in several older educational and promotional films and TV programmes, including the 1955 film Crofter Boy, and the 1990s documentary Last Postbus to Gairloch (Channel 4), featuring the postbus (mini-van carrying passengers & mail) that was an additional link for various parts of the nearby community, before being withdrawn by Royal Mail.

The area around Gairloch is also the outdoor location of films Stardust (2007), What We Did on Our Holiday (2014) and Out of Darkness (2022).

== Notable people ==
- An annual festival used to be held in Gairloch commemorating John Mackay (1656–1754) piper to the Tacksman of Clan Mackenzie of Gairloch.
- Regarding Scottish Gaelic literature, Gairloch is important as the final resting place of former Church of Scotland parish schoolmaster and bard Uilleam Ros or William Ross (1762–1791), known as 'the Gairloch bard'. His 1783 poem Moladh Gheàrrloch ("In Praise of Gairloch") describes the Highland winter sport of shinty played upon New Year's Day at ebb tide upon the Big Sand. It is, according to Ronald Black, "as succinct a description as we have of the great festive shinty matches of the past."
- George McIver, a writer of science fiction in Australian literature, was born at Gairloch.
- Former footballer Harold Davis lived in the village in his later life, running a hotel.
