= Clan Inglis =

Scottish clan

- Motto: Nobilis Est Ira Leonis ('The lion's anger is noble')

Profile
- District: Lanarkshire, Cramond, Craigend, Murdostoun, Heartwood, Roxburghshire and Auchindinny
- Plant badge: Mayflower
- Clan Inglis no longer has a chief, and is an armigerous clan
- Historic seat: Craigend Castle; Branxholme Castle
- Last Chief: Sir John Inglis of Cramond
- Died: 24 Nov 1817
Clan branches
- Inglis of Cramond
- Inglis of Gairloch
- Inglis of Milton Bryan
- Inglis of Craigend
- Inglis of Newtonleys
- Inglis of Murdostoun
- Inglis of Fingask
- Inglis of Inglistarvit
- Inglis of Branxholme
- Inglis of Manor
- Inglis of Hartwood
- Inglis of Auchindinny
- Inglis of Tarvit
See also: Inglis baronets
Allied clans
- Clan Douglas
  Clan MacIntyre
  Clan Buchanan
  Clan Scott
  Clan Hamilton
Titles
- Baron Manner
- Baron Cramond
- Baron Gairloch
- Baron Milton Bryan
- Baron Branxholme
- Baron Murdostoun
- Laird of Murdostoun
- Baron Tarvit

Clan Inglis is a Scottish clan with origins dating back to 1153 during the reign of King David I. As the clan does not currently have a chief recognised by the Court of the Lord Lyon, it is considered an armigerous clan. Throughout history members of the Inglis Clan are known and respected for their military, political and judicial service.

== History ==
=== Origins ===
The name Inglis is thought to originate from the Old English word for "Englishman". One of the earliest mentions of the name, Richard Anglicus, appears in the 12th century, recorded in a charter witnessed by David I for Melrose Abbey.

In 1296, when Edward I invaded Scotland, the names of John de Inglis, Walter de Inglis, and Philip de Inglis appear as significant landowners.

Alliance with Clan Douglas

By the early 14th century, an Inglis family resided in Douglasdale, Lanarkshire, alongside the Douglases. At the time, the area was under frequent English occupation. The Inglises earned the Douglases' gratitude when one family member overheard a plot to seize the castle and risked their life to warn them. As a reward, the Inglises were granted part of St. Bride's Church as their family burial site, and their coat of arms is still visible on the wall of the south transept today.

Strengthening their longstanding alliance with the Douglases, the Inglises added the three Douglas stars to their own coat of arms. Today the Inglis clan is a sect of the Douglas Clan.

Baronage of Manner

In 1395, during the reigns of Robert II and III, Sir William Inglis fought and killed the English champion Sir Thomas Struthers in a duel on the spot. In recognition of this, the family was awarded the Barony of Manner by royal charter in 1396.

The Barony of Manner was sold in 1709 during the leadership of Charles Inglis of Craigend, who died in 1743. In 1722, Nisbet mentioned cadet branches of the family, such as Inglis of Newtonleys and Inglis of St. Leonards, descendants of Murieston.

Baronage of Cramond (1687)

The Inglis family of Cramond gained prominence in Edinburgh, having acquired the lands of Cramond from the Bishop of Dunkeld in 1624. John Inglis of Cramond constructed Cramond House in 1680, where a tower from the Bishop's palace still stands today. The house became a social hub for the elite, and in 1860, the Duchess of Kent, Queen Victoria's mother, visited. Less than a year later, Queen Victoria herself stayed there en route to Balmoral.

Sir James Inglis of Cramond was granted a baronetcy in 1687, and his son Sir John Inglis, 2nd Baronet served as Post Master General of Scotland until 1725. The male line of the family ended with Sir John Inglis of Cramond, 5th Baronet, leading to the extinction of the baronetcy, and the estate passed to his daughter, Lady Torphichen. The title became dormant on the death of the fifth Baronet in 1817. On 4 December 2018 the thirteenth Baronet proved his succession and was entered on the Official Roll of the Baronetage.

- Sir William St Clair Inglis, 13th Baronet (born 1942), succeeded 1970, claim admitted on 4 December 2018.

Cramond House now belongs to Cramond Kirk and is still in use.

== Clan seats ==
- Cramond House, Edinburgh. Home of the Inglis of Cramond family. Queen Victoria's mother, the Duchess of Kent, was a regular house guest. Cramond House is now owned by Cramond kirk.
- Cramond Tower
- Craigend Castle, Mugdock Country Park, East Dunbartonshire. Inglis of Craigend family seat, passed to the Buchanans and incorporated into a mansion in 1812.
- Branxholm Castle has been owned by the Clan Scott since 1420.
- Scotstarvit Tower In 1611 sold to Sir John Scot, Lord Scotstarvit.

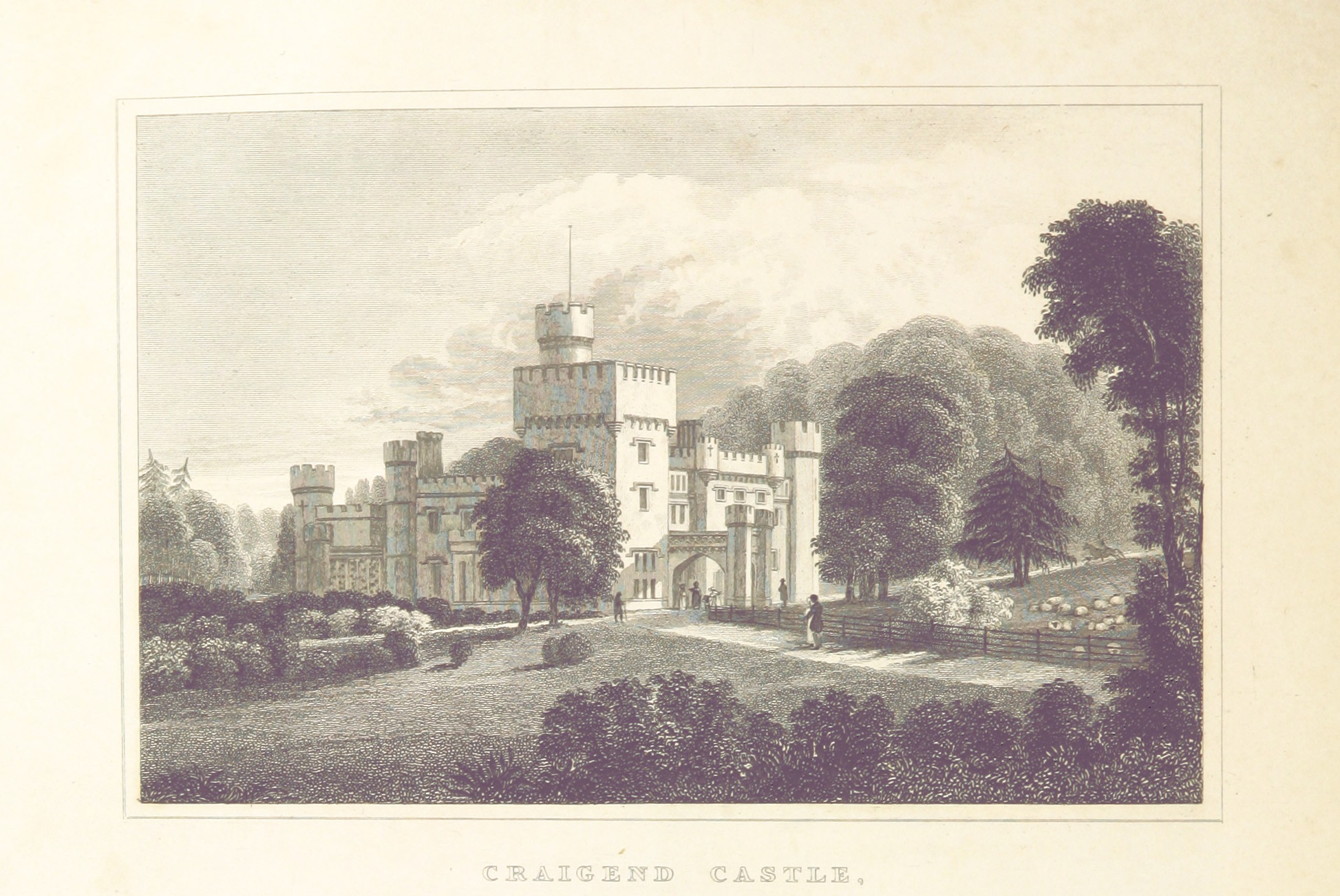
Craigend Castle in 1829

== Titles ==
The known Inglis baronets include:

Peerage of Scotland

- Baron Manner (1396) (by Royal Charter)
- Baron Branxholme (15th century)
- Baron Brankolm
- Baron Murdostoun
- Laird of Murdostoun
- Baron Tarvit
- Laird of Tarvit
- Laid of Auchindinny
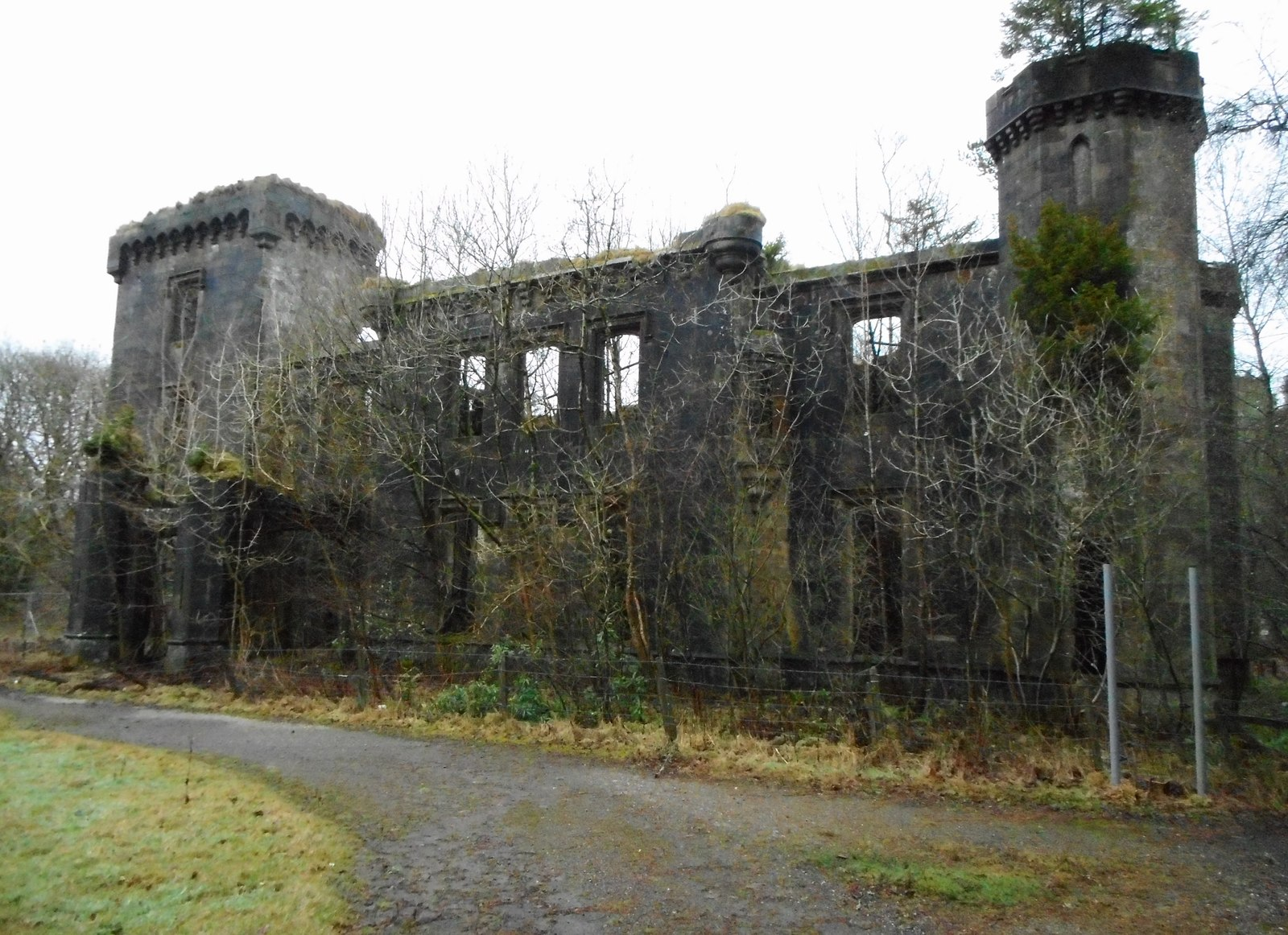
  The ruins of Craigend Castle

Peerage of Nova Scotia (created in the Baronetage of Nova Scotia)

- Baron Cramond (1687)
- Baron Gairloch (1703) (also known as Inglis of Glencorse)

Peerage of the United Kingdom

- Baron Milton Bryan (1801)

Baron Cramond	Baron Gairloch	Baron Milton Bryan
Baron Cramond	Baron Gairloch	Baron Milton Bryan

== Tartans ==
Tartan image	Notes
	There is also an Ancient Inglis version of the tartan which has much lighter colour tones.

== Notable members of the Inglis family ==
Inglis members are known mainly for their military, political, judicial and trade service.

- Sir William Inglis 14th century Scottish knight rewarded King Robert III.
- Sir James Inglis, 1st Baronet of Cramond (1660–1688)
- Sir John Inglis of Cramond, 2nd Baronet (September 1683 – 3 March 1771) Postmaster General for Scotland.
- William Inglis (3 April 1713 -10 July 1792) Surgeon and President of the Royal College of Surgeons of Edinburgh.
- Rear Admiral Charles Inglis (1731 – 10 October 1791) Royal Navy Admiral.
- Sir Hugh Inglis, 1st Baronet (30 April 1744 – 21 August 1820) East Indies merchant and Director of the British East India Company.
- John Inglis (1762–1834) Scottish minister and Moderator of the General Assembly of the Church of Scotland
- Lieutenant-General Sir William Inglis KCB (1764–1835) British Army General.
- Sir Robert Harry Inglis, 2nd Baronet FRS (12 January 1786 – 5 May 1855) Conservative politician.
- Major General Sir John Eardley Wilmot Inglis KCB (15 November 1814 – 27 September 1862) British Army General.
- Post-Captain Charles Inglis (died 27 February 1833) Royal Navy Officer and Captain of HMS Victory between 1824 and 1827.
- Rt Hon John Inglis, Lord Glencorse (21 August 1810 – 20 August 1891) Lord President of the Court of Session.
- Julia Selina, Lady Inglis (19 April 1833 – 3 February 1904) daughter of Frederic Thesiger, 1st Baron Chelmsford, and wife of Major-General Sir John Eardley Inglis.
- Eliza Maud "Elsie" Inglis (16 August 1864 – 26 November 1917) Scottish medical doctor and founder of the Scottish Women's Hospitals.
- Sir Charles Edward Inglis OBE FRS (31 July 1875 – 19 April 1952) British civil engineer.
- Air Vice Marshal Francis Frederic Inglis CB CBE DL (22 June 1899 – 25 September 1969) Royal Air Force officer and head of RAF Intelligence during WW2.
- Vice-Admiral Sir John Gilchrist Thesiger Inglis KBE CB (8 June 1906 – 29 October 1972) Royal Navy admiral who served as Director of Naval Intelligence.

== See also ==
- Scottish clans
- Inglis Baronets
- Inglis Baronets of Cramond 1687
- Lieutenant-General Sir William Inglis KCB
