= Loch Lomond wanderer =

Historic human remains found in Scotland

'The Loch Lomond wanderer'
- Years active: 6th century AD
- Known for: Body uncovered from mass grave in Cramond, Scotland

The 'Loch Lomond Wanderer' or 'Medieval Wanderer' is the name given to a body thrown into a mass grave in Cramond in the 6th century AD.

== History ==
The body was discovered in a Cramond bog in 1975. It was among the skeletal remains of nine adults and five infants uncovered in the archaeological site of a former Roman fort in what was the latrine of a Roman bath house. The remains, coined 'the bodies in the bog', have fascinated researchers for decades, and originally it was believed they may have been victims of the Black Death or shipwreck victims from around the 14th century.

Radiocarbon dating has since identified that the remains are from the 6th century AD. They were initially thought to be a family who had perished together. Further osteological analysis found the remains of a woman and child evidencing violent blunt force injuries to the head, possibly by being hit with the butt end of a spear.

== Diet, origins and early medieval population mobility ==
Researchers at the University of Aberdeen examined the bones and teeth and used isotope analyses to ascertain the possible diet and origins of the bodies. The analysis demonstrated that, though the bodies were laid in close proximity to one another, they seemed to have been brought up hundreds of miles apart, prompting the idea that some of the group may have travelled across Scotland to make the Cramond area their home.

The senior author of the research study, Professor Kate Britton, stated that:

"Food and water consumed during life leave a specific signature in the body which can be traced back to their input source, evidencing diet and mobility patterns. Tooth enamel, particularly from teeth which form between around three and six years of age, act like little time capsules containing chemical information about where a person grew up.

When we examined the remains, we found six of them to bear chemical signatures consistent with what we would expect from individuals growing up in the area local to Cramond, but two – those of a man and a woman – were very different.

This suggests that they spent their childhoods somewhere else, with the analysis of the female placing her origins on the west coast.”

The male instead had an isotopic signature more typical of the Southern Uplands, Southern Highlands or Loch Lomond area so it is likely he came to Cramond from an inland area."

The study's findings, published in the Archaeological and Anthropological Sciences journal, provide insights into early medieval population mobility in Scotland. Cramond was one of the key political centres in this period when the country was divided between the Scotti in Dál Riata in the west, the Picts in northern Scotland and the Britons in the south. Dr Orsolya Czére, post-doctoral researcher and lead author of the study, added:

“It is often assumed that travel in this period would have been limited without roads like we have today and given the political divides of the time. The analysis of the burials from Cramond, along with other early medieval burial sites in Scotland, are revealing that it was not unusual to be buried far from where you had originally grown up.... This is an important step in unravelling how these different populations of early medieval Scotland and Britain interacted.”
