= Ghillie Dhu =

Fairy from scottish folklore

The Ghillie Dhu or Gille Dubh (Scottish Gaelic pronunciation: [ˈkʲiʎə ˈt̪u]) is a solitary male fairy described in Scottish folklore. He was said to be dark-haired, and clothed in leaves and moss, from which the ghillie suit got its name. He appears primarily in accounts from the late 18th century, living in a birch wood in the north-west Highlands of Scotland. He was said to fiercely protect the forest from outsiders, but with accounts of him treating children with kindness.

== Etymology ==
Ghillie is an English equivalent of the Scottish Gaelic word gille. English lexicographer Edward Dwelly lists gille as a "lad", "youth", or "boy"; with dubh meaning "dark" or "dark-haired".

== Folk beliefs ==
According to folklorist Katharine Briggs, the Ghillie Dhu was a gentle and kind-hearted mountain spirit, or a "rather unusual nature fairy." He was generally timid, yet he could also be "wild". Generally of a dishevelled appearance, he used green moss and leaves taken from trees as clothing. As indicated by his name, he had black hair. He was of a small stature. His fondness of children is similar to that displayed by the little known Hyter sprite of English mythology. He was said to live in the birch woods near Loch an Draing, in the north-west Highland area of Gairloch. The woods are in a dip alongside a hilly area around 2 miles (3.2 kilometres) from where Rua Reidh Lighthouse was later built. He was mainly reported in the latter part of the 18th century. He was described by Osgood Mackenzie, a Scottish landowner and horticulturist, in his 1921 memoirs.

The best known account of the Ghillie Dhu involves a girl named Jessie Macrae, who lived near the woods. She wandered into the woods and became lost as the sun went down. Her sobs reportedly drew the attention of the Ghillie Dhu, who comforted her and either led her home before darkness fell, or stayed with her all night and led her home in the morning. Over a period of four decades the fairy was reportedly seen by many people but Jessie was the only person with whom he conversed.

At some point, landowner Sir Hector Mackenzie of Gairloch invited a group of five Mackenzie dignitaries to hunt and capture the Ghillie Dhu, which he believed posed a threat. Despite searching extensively throughout the night, the hunters could not find their prey; according to mythology scholar Patricia Monaghan, the Ghillie Dhu was never seen again.

== Origins ==
After researching folklore traditions gathered primarily from Gaelic areas of Scotland, an authority on congenital disorders, Susan Schoon Eberly, has speculated the tale of the Ghillie Dhu may have a basis in a human being with a medical condition; other academics, such as Carole G. Silver, Professor of English at Stern College for Women, agree and suggest he was a dwarf. Eberly maintained several other solitary or individual fairies, including the Brownie and the Manx Fenodyree, could also have a medical, rather than supernatural, explanation.

== Bibliography ==
- Black, Ronald (2005), "Introduction", The Gaelic Otherworld: John Gregorson Campbell's Superstitions of the Highlands and Islands of Scotland and Witchcraft and Second Sight in the Highlands and Islands, Birlinn – via Questia
- Briggs, Katharine Mary (1961), "Some Late Accounts of the Fairies", Folklore, 72 (3), Taylor and Francis, JSTOR 1258579
- Briggs, Katharine Mary (2002) [1967], The Fairies in Tradition and Literature, Psychology Press, ISBN 978-0-415-28601-5
- Dixon, John H. (1886), Gairloch in North-west Ross-shire, Edinburgh Co-operative Printing
- Dwelly, Edward (1902), Faclair Gàidhlìg air son nan sgoiltean, vol. 2, E. MacDonald
- Eberly, Susan Schoon (1988), "Fairies and the Folklore of Disability: Changelings, Hybrids and the Solitary Fairy", Folklore, 99 (1), Taylor and Francis, JSTOR 1259568
- Mackenzie, Osgood Hanbury (1921), A Hundred Years in the Highlands, Edward Arnold
- Monaghan, Patricia (2009), The Encyclopedia of Celtic Mythology and Folklore, Infobase Publishing, ISBN 978-1-4381-1037-0
- Rabuzzi, Daniel Allen (1984), "In Pursuit of Norfolk's Hyter Sprites", Folklore, 95 (1), Taylor and Francis, JSTOR 1259761
- Silver, Carole G. (2000), Strange and Secret Peoples: Fairies and Victorian Consciousness, Oxford University Press, archived from the original on 14 November 2007 – via Questia

== See also ==
- Ghillie suit
- Dryad
- Aos Sí
