= John Macdonald Kinneir =

Scottish army officer of the East India Company, diplomat and traveller

Sir John Macdonald Kinneir (3 February 1782 – 11 June 1830) was a Scottish army officer of the East India Company, diplomat and traveller.

== Life ==
Born at Carnden, Linlithgow, on 3 February 1782, Kinneir was the son of John Macdonald, comptroller of customs at Borrowstounness, and Cecilia Maria Kinneir. In 1802, he was nominated to a cadetship by Sir William Bensley, under the surname Macdonald, which was used in Indian army lists for the rest of his life. He published his books under the name Macdonald Kinneir.

On 21 September 1804 Kinneir was appointed ensign in the Madras infantry, but was not posted until the formation of the 24th Madras Native Infantry on 1 January 1807, when he joined the new corps as lieutenant. He became captain in his regiment on 14 April 1818, and was later brevet lieutenant-colonel. For some time he was secretary to the officer commanding in Malabar and Kanara.

Kinneir was attached to Sir John Malcolm's mission in Persia in 1808–9, during part of which time he was supernumerary agent at Bushehr, and travelled widely. In 1810 he went from Baghdad, by way of Mosul and Diarbekr, to Constantinople, visited Manisa and Smyrna, and returned to England through Spain and Portugal. Then ordered to rejoin his regiment, he journeyed to Stockholm in January 1813 with Colonel Neil Campbell, intending to reach India through Russia and Persia; but after the retreat from Moscow left open a southerly route, he accompanied Campbell to Kilisch in Poland, and then went via Austria and Hungary to Constantinople. After visiting Asia Minor and Cyprus, he returned to Constantinople, and travelled through Armenia and Kurdistan to Bagdad and Bombay.

From 1813 Kinneir was for some years town-major of Fort St George, Madras, and resident with the Nawab of the Carnatic. In 1824 he was appointed envoy to Fath-Ali Shah Qajar of Persia, for the East India Company. He arrived at the shah's camp at Ahar in September 1826, during the Russo-Persian War (1826–28). Persia was claiming the British subsidy to which by the treaty of Teheran it was entitled, if attacked by a European power; Kinneir would not support the subsidy, stating that the aggression had been on the side of Persia. Military operations followed, during which Kinneir was with the Persian army, until, on 19 October 1827, Erivan Fortress was stormed by Ivan Paskievich's troops. A Russian division pushed on to Tabriz, and the shah's chief minister, Ali Yar Khan, deserted him and fled to Ali Bengloo with Kinneir, who strove to bring about a peace.

The Russians accepted Kinneir's mediation, and a treaty was signed at Turkmenchay on 23 February 1828, involving a loss of territory to Persia and the end of the influence previously enjoyed by the British mission. Kinneir received the Persian order Order of the Lion and the Sun and on 17 November 1829 was created a knight bachelor. He remained as envoy in Persia until his death at Tabriz on 11 June 1830, when a period of three months' mourning was observed by the shah.

== Works ==
Kinneir published:

- Gazetteer of Persia, with map (London, 1813) - A geographical memoir of the Persian Empire
- Narrative of Travels in Asia Minor, Armenia, and Kurdistan in 1813–14, with Remarks on the Marches of Alexander the Great and of the Ten Thousand Greeks (London, 1818).

== Family ==
Kinneir married Amelia Harriet, third daughter by his first wife of Sir Alexander Campbell, 1st Baronet; her elder sister married Sir John Malcolm. She survived her husband, and died at Boulogne in 1860.
