= William Bensley =

18th century English businessman

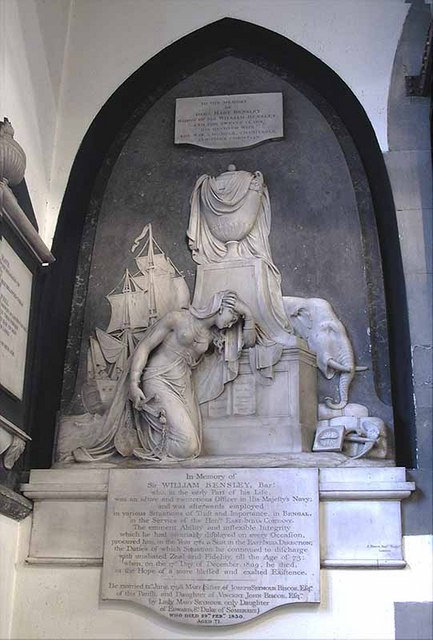
Monument in Bletchingley Church to Sir William Bensley and his wife Mary, by John Bacon

Sir William Bensley, 1st Baronet (1737 – 17 December 1809) was an English director of the East India Company.

== Life ==
He was the son of Thomas Bensley, and his wife Elizabeth Winter, daughter of William Winter, both of Norfolk.

Bensley was made lieutenant in the Royal Navy in 1757. At the end of the Seven Years' War he was put on half-pay, and in 1764 he went to the Bengal Presidency as an East Company employee, remaining with the Company until 1777. Robert Clive recommended him for a writership, and he was given the position in 1766. He became an agent for Richard Barwell, and retained that connection when he returned to England. Judged honest by Barwell, he made money as station custom master, according to Philip Francis.

Back in England, Bensley associated with "nabobs" such as Francis Sykes and Richard Becher (died 1782), and was a supporter of Warren Hastings as a potential reformer. In 1781 he was elected a director of the East India Company. The East India Bill of 1783 and trial of Warren Hastings starting in 1785 drew him closer into the group around Hastings, such as John Sullivan. With Francis Baring and Hugh Inglis, he backed John Shore for a Council seat in Bengal in 1786. At one point at odds with Henry Dundas, he had reached an accommodation by 1789.

Bensley was created baronet of St Marylebone in the County of Middlesex on 24 June 1801. In 1805 he leased 53 Berners Street in London. He had previously lived on the same Berners Street estate, sharing with a friend, John Routledge (died 1798). When the impoverished Nathaniel Brassey Halhed was given an East India Company post in 1809, it was through Bensley's patronage.

Bensley died on 17 December 1809, and the baronetcy became extinct.

The Indiaman Sir William Bensley was launched at Ipswich in 1802. By 1816 it had become a transport ship for convicts.

== Family ==
Bensley married, on 12 June 1798, Mary Biscoe, daughter of Vincent John Biscoe (died 1770), a West Indian merchant and his first wife Lady Mary Seymour, daughter of Edward Seymour, 8th Duke of Somerset.

Mary Biscoe, who died in 1830, had before her marriage supported the aged Rev. James Hutton (1715–1795). She was a friend of Stephana Law, daughter of John Law the Archdeacon of Rochester, and brought about Stephana's marriage in 1799 to her brother Joseph Seymour Biscoe as his second wife. The first marriage, to Susanna Harriot Hope (1768–1839), had ended after a high-profile adultery case involving Richard Hope Gordon. As Lady Bensley, she died in Berners Street, age 69 or 70.

Having made a large fortune, Bensley died without issue. Robert Bensley the actor was his nephew, or son of James Bensley, uncle of William Bensley. Robert Bensley inherited from Sir William, an estate that was reported as worth £4,000 per year.

== Notes ==
Baronetage of the United Kingdom
New title	Baronet (of Saint Marylebone); 1801–1809	Extinct
