= Milnes baronets =

Extinct baronetcy in the Baronetage of the United Kingdom

- Escutcheon of the Milnes baronets of Gauley
- Creation date: 1801
- Status: extinct
- Extinction date: 1839
- Seat(s): Cockle Hall, Sherwood Forest
- Motto: Soyez sans reproche

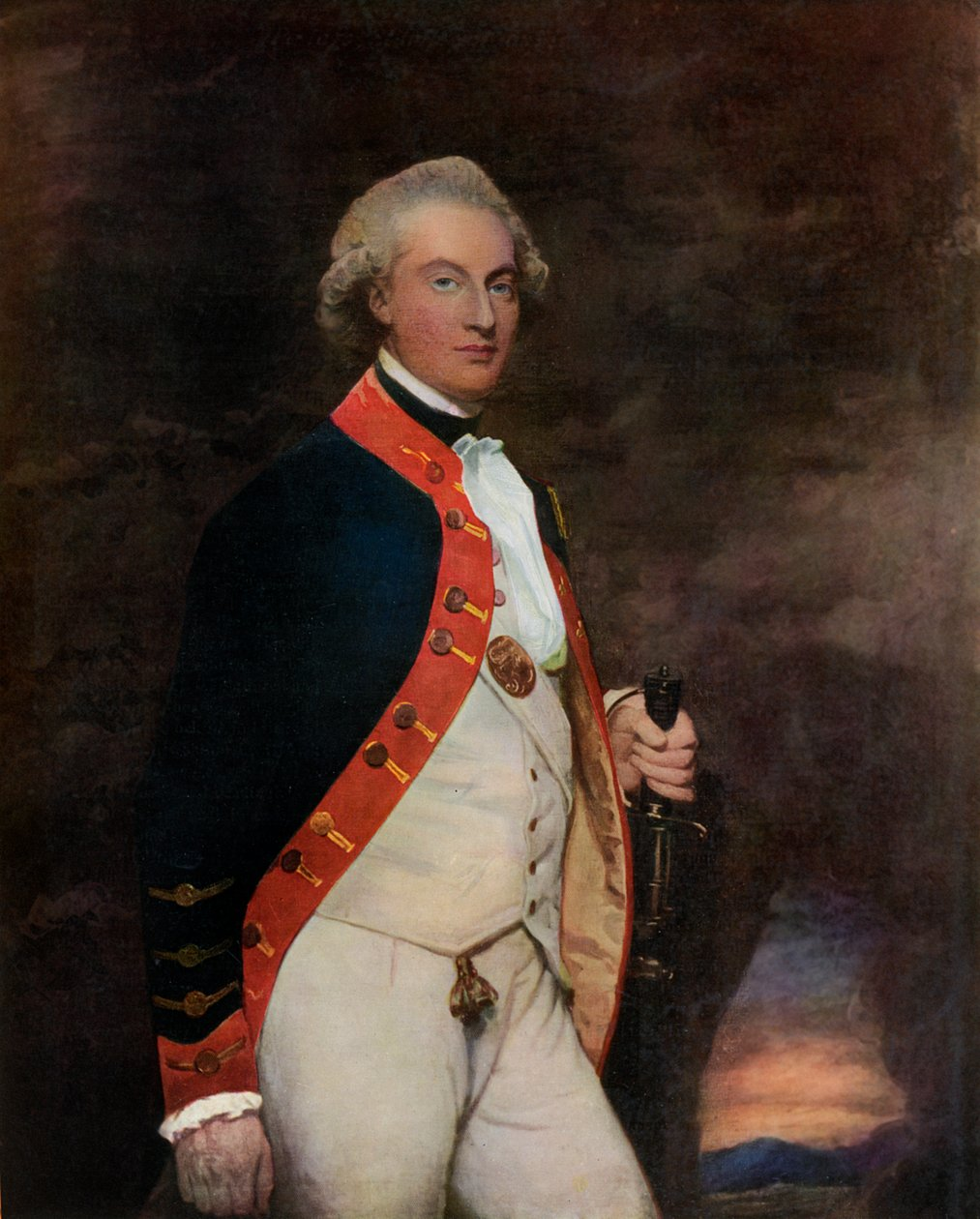
Portrait of Sir Robert Milnes, 1st Baronet by George Romney

The Milnes baronetcy, of Gauley in the County of Leicester, was a title in the Baronetage of the United Kingdom. It was created on 21 March 1801 for the colonial governor Robert Milnes. The title became extinct on the death of the invalid second Baronet in 1839, the only surviving son, "after many years in delicate and precarious health" residing at Sydling.

Richard Milnes, uncle of the first Baronet, was the great-great-grandfather of Richard Monckton Milnes, 1st Baron Houghton.

== Milnes baronets, of Gauley (1801) ==
- Sir Robert Shore Milnes, 1st Baronet (1747–1837)
- Sir John Bentinck Milnes, 2nd Baronet (1786–1839)

== See also ==
- Marquess of Crewe
- Milnes Coates baronets

Baronetage of the United Kingdom
Preceded by Vavasour baronets	Milnes baronets of Gauley; 21 March 1801	Succeeded by Inglis baronets
