= Bensley baronets =

Extinct baronetcy in the Baronetage of the United Kingdom

Escutcheon of the Bensley baronets

The Bensley Baronetcy, of Saint Marylebone in the Middlesex County, was a title within the Baronetage of the United Kingdom. It was created on June 25, 1801, for William Bensley, a director of the Honourable East India Company. The title became extinct upon his death in 1809.

== Bensley baronets, of Saint Marylebone (1801) ==
- Sir William Bensley, 1st Baronet (c. 1737–1809)

Baronetage of the United Kingdom
Preceded by Ball baronets	Bensley baronets Saint Marylebone; 25 June 1801	Succeeded by Welby baronets
