= John Philip Wood =

Scottish antiquary and biographer

John Philp Wood (died 1838) was a Scottish antiquary and biographer.

== Life ==
His family was from Cramond, near Edinburgh. Though deaf-mute from early childhood, he held for many years the office of auditor of excise in Scotland. Wood died at Edinburgh in December 1838. He was a friend of Walter Scott, who called him ‘honest John Wood,’ and the brother-in-law of Robert Cadell, the business partner of Archibald Constable.

== Works ==
In 1791 he published A Sketch of the Life and Projects of John Law of Lauriston, Comptroller-general of the Finances of France (Edinburgh). A new and enlarged edition, entitled Memoirs of the Life of John Law, appeared in 1824, speculation and John Law (a native of Cramond) being topical. which the extravagance of contemporary commercial speculation aroused.

Map from The Ancient and Modern State of the Parish of Cramond.

Wood brought out in 1794 the first parochial history attempted in Scotland, The Ancient and Modern State of the Parish of Cramond (Edinburgh). His major work was his edition of the Peerage of Scotland, by Sir Robert Douglas, printed at Edinburgh in two folio volumes in 1813. He had originally intended to bring out a separate peerage for the period between 1707 and 1809, but was persuaded to incorporate his collections with Douglas's work. He made contributions to the Gentleman's Magazine, and communicated to John Nichols most of the biographical notes to poets in ‘The Muses Welcome to King James,’ printed in the Progresses of King James I.
