= Loch an Draing =

Loch in Wester Ross, Scotland

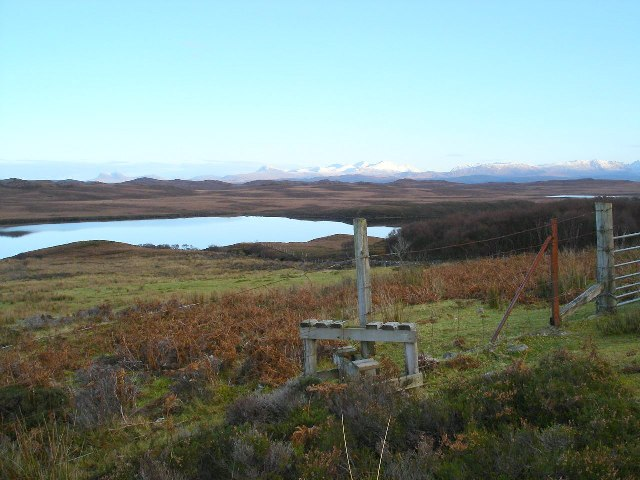
- View from Loch an Draing from the southwest

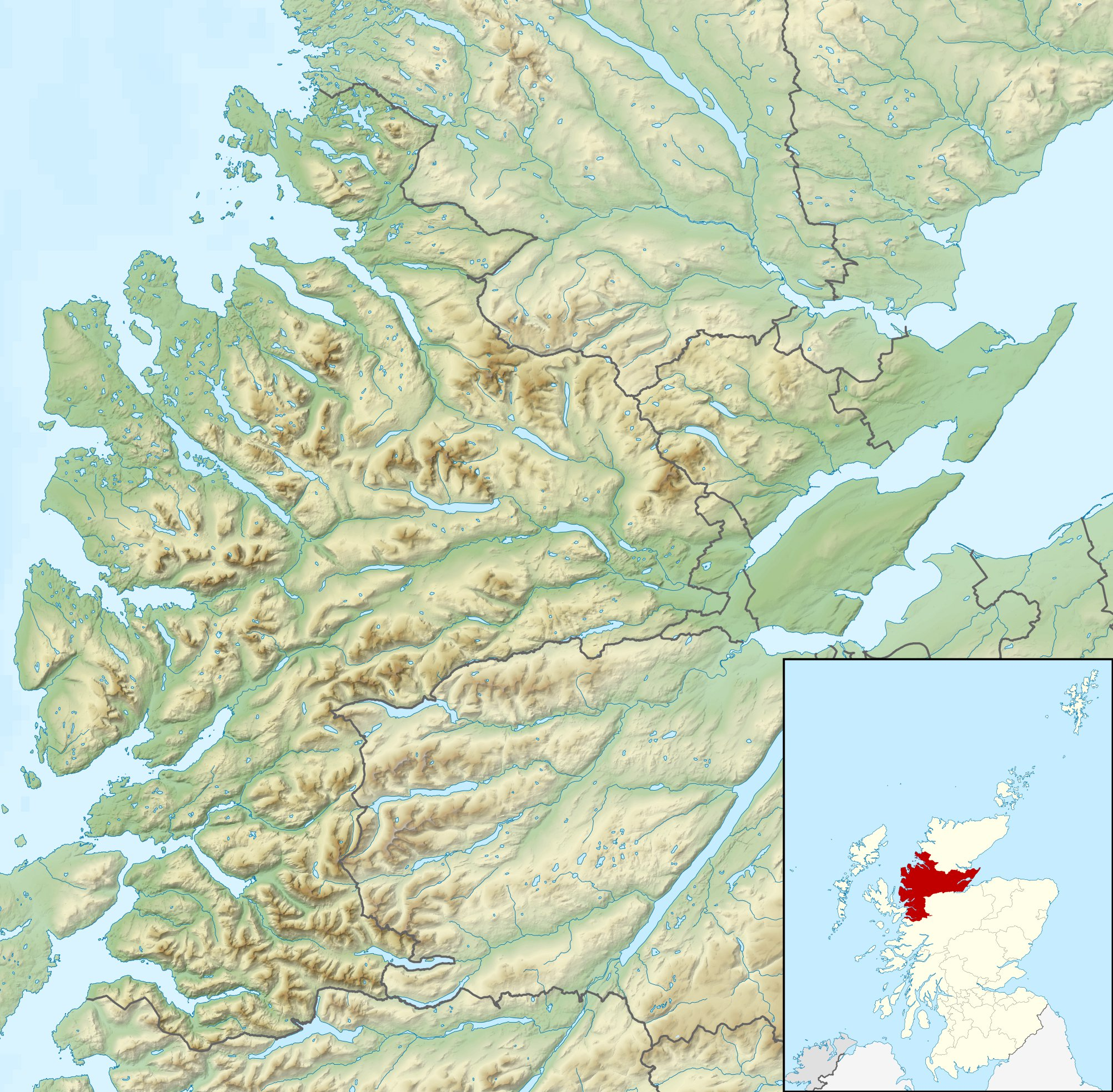
- Location in Wester Ross
- Location: NG77569048
- Coordinates: 57.849157°N 5.750083°W
- Type: freshwater loch
- Basin countries: Scotland
- Max. length: 1.2 km (0.75 mi)
- Max. width: 0.4 km (0.25 mi)
- Surface area: 39 ha (96 acres)
- Average depth: 25 ft (7.6 m)
- Max. depth: 55 ft (17 m)
- Water volume: 109,226,392.5 ft^{3} (3,092,947.00 m^{3})
- Shore length^{1}: 3 km (1.9 mi)
- Surface elevation: 44 m (144 ft)
- Max. temperature: 59 °F (15 °C) at 0 feet.
- Min. temperature: 58 °F (14 °C) at 40 feet.
- ^{1} Shore length is not a well-defined measure.

Loch an Draing is a small remote freshwater loch that is orientated north-north-west by south-south-east and is located 3.7 miles north-west of the hamlet of Inverasdale, on the Melvaig Peninsula in Wester Ross, Scotland. Directly north-by-north-west is the small loch of Loch nan Eun which drains Loch an Draing through the Abhainn na Leuma burn into the The Minch about 2.5 miles to the west of the entrance of Loch Ewe.

== Geography ==
The ground around the loch consists mostly of peat. To the east are low but steep knolls some 200 to 300 feet that contains a number of small lochs. To the west lies a ridge with Maol Breac, that rises steeply to a height of 276m (905 feet) that forms the southern peak of An Cuaidh at 296m (971 feet) located in the south-west. To the south-east there is a large number of small lochs, the largest of which is Loch a' Chaol-thuil.

== Gallery ==
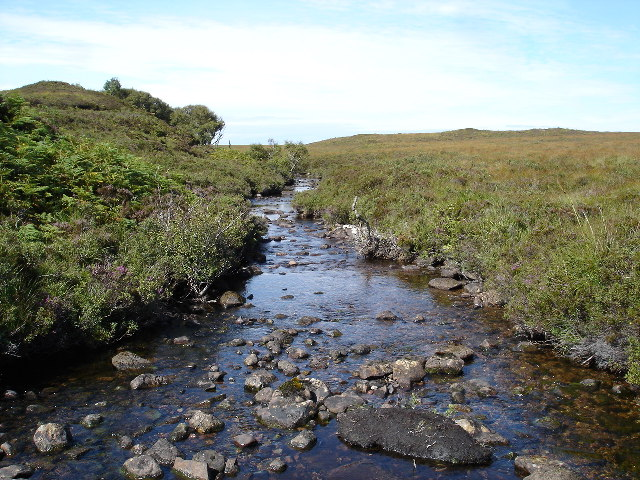
River draining Loch an Draing into Loch nan Eun. The path crosses a bridge over this short river between loch.

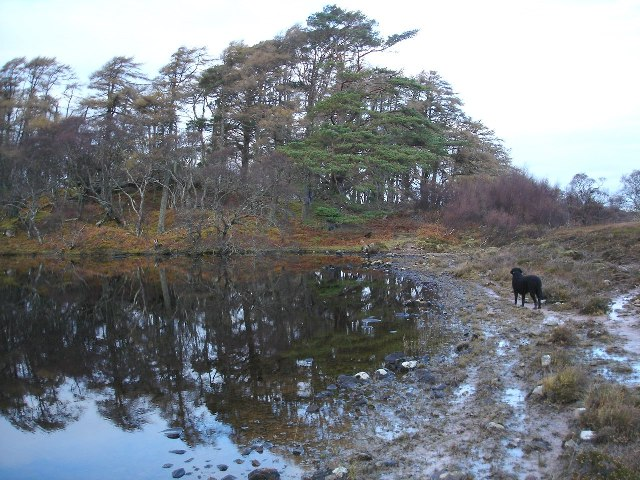
The small loch directly south of Loch an Draing. Loch Ceann a' Charnaich. The woods are the haunt of the Gille Dubh, a fairy, who once helped a Jessie McRae who had been lost in the woods. Gille Dubh has not been seen since the 1800s, when a group of MacKenzie lairds came to shoot the fairy.

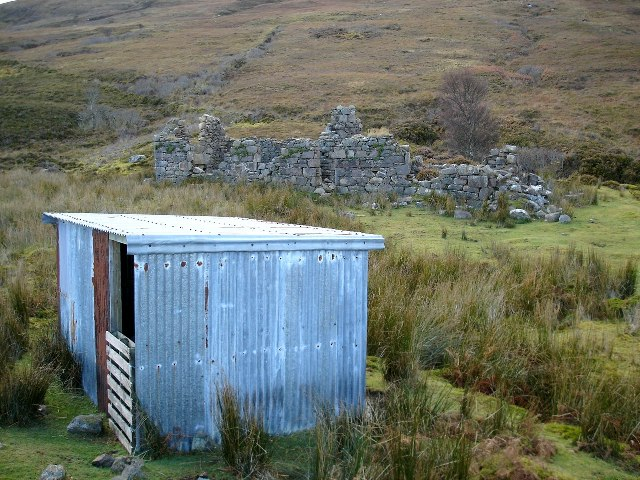
Shed and Ruin at Loch an draing. There are a number of ruins here, the one shown looks like it was a reasonable house. The shed looks like it's used by a shepherd for temporary shelter.
