= Margaret Douglas, Countess of Bothwell =

Scottish aristocrat and courtier

Margaret Douglas, Countess of Bothwell (died 1640) was a Scottish aristocrat and courtier.

She was a daughter of David Douglas, 7th Earl of Angus and Margaret Hamilton, daughter of John Hamilton of Samuelston, sometimes called "Clydesdale John", and a half-brother of Regent Arran.

== Lady Buccleuch ==
She was first married to Walter Scott of Branxholme & Buccleuch, who died in 1574. This was advantageous to the Scott family because Regent Morton was her uncle. Their children included:

- Walter Scott, later Lord Scott of Buccleuch.
- Margaret Scott, sometimes said to have married to Robert Scott of Thirlestane.
- Mary Scott, who married William Elliott of Lariston

After Walter Scott died on 17 April 1574 she completed rebuilding work at Branxholme Castle in October 1576 and had this achievement carved in stone on the building.

== Countess of Bothwell ==
On 1 December 1577, she married Francis Stewart, 5th Earl of Bothwell. After a brief honeymoon, the new earl was not permitted to come within twenty miles of his new wife 'for reassone of his youngnes'.

In June 1588 she entertained a party of English officers from Berwick at Coldingham including Captain Carey, the provost marshal, Captain Walker, George Barratt, James Somer. At the end of the dinner the Scottish gentleman toasted James VI and prayed for revenge for the death of his mother, Mary, Queen of Scots. One officer replied that it was good for James VI that she was gone, as she had been a usurper. Captain Carey came to another dinner at Coldingham and the Earl of Bothwell got him drunk, and he walked for a long time alone with countess, out of earshot. It was said she that questioned him on matters of state. At the end of this dinner, the same toast was made, and Captain Walker replied that Mary had been executed by law.

Her daughter Elizabeth Stewart was baptised at Holyroodhouse on 1 March 1590. The English diplomat Robert Bowes gave a gift of a silver ewer and basin worth £100, made in Edinburgh by the silversmith Thomas Foulis, and Bowes also gave rewards to the nurse, midwives, musicians and servants in Bothwell's household. Bowes asked Francis Walsingham to make arrangements for credit in London for these diplomatic gifts. Elizabeth Stewart wife of James Stewart, 2nd Earl of Moray was witness for Queen Elizabeth I.

At the coronation of Anne of Denmark on 17 May 1590, the Countess of Bothwell, Robert Bowes's wife Eleanor Musgrove, the Countess of Mar, and Jean Kennedy, Countess of Orkney, carried the train of the queen's gown and cloak.

Bothwell was forfeited following the North Berwick Witch Trials. The Countess had a second son in April 1591 and was allowed to speak to Bothwell, who was then in ward in Edinburgh Castle for "conspiring the king's death by sorcery". She asked the Chancellor John Maitland of Thirlestane to intercede for her. He said he could not meddle in matters that concerned attempts on the king's life.

She persuaded Colonel William Stewart of Houston to take Bothwell's letter to the king at Stirling Castle, in an attempt to regain the king's favour. William Stewart was arrested. The English ambassador Robert Bowes sent a copy of the letter to William Cecil in September 1591, and Sir Robert Cecil sent a copy to the English Chancellor, Christopher Hatton. On 18 October 1591 there was a search for Bothwell in Leith and his horse Grey Valentine was found. The Countess said "bitter words" to Chancellor Maitland and the Earl of Huntly. She was ordered to go from Leith to ward in Aberdeen. The English ambassador Robert Bowes thought her words had broken the "knot of friendship" between Bothwell and Maitland.

The Earl of Bothwell broke into Holyrood House on 27 December 1591, and it was alleged that Margaret Douglas was waiting in a house in the Canongate for her husband's success, with jewels and money to attend the queen. In October 1592 she and Bothwell were in England, and were at the house of Walter Graham at Netherby on the water of Esk.

On 17 November 1592 she kneeled on the street before James VI as he was going to Edinburgh Castle, and after Lord Home and Lord Lindsay spoke in her favour she was allowed to kiss the king's hand, who spoke harshly of her and her husband. She was applauded and carried back to her lodging by well-wishers. She was heavily pregnant. James VI made a proclamation against her the next day for her support of her rebel husband. She was said to be "a griter mellair", to have had more involvement in her husband's treasons, "than became a woman".

In July 1593 Bothwell entered Holyroodhouse house again to seek the king's forgiveness or to kidnap him, and it was said the countess had organised this by negotiating with Marie Ruthven, Countess of Atholl, who engaged the support of her husband, the Earl of Atholl, and the Duke of Lennox, Lord Ochiltree, and Lord Spynie.

In April 1594 she was at Moss Tower and Bothwell visited during an armed standoff at Kelso with troops led by Lord Home, Cessford, and Buccleuch. In September 1595 she got a letter in her favour from the king after "prostrating herself in his highness's way and presence." However she had the letter proclaimed publicly, not as intended, for it was meant only to allow her to dwell peaceably at Moss Tower.

In July 1602 it was rumoured her daughter Elizabeth Stewart would marry the "young Earl of Morton".

Thomas Douglas, a kinsman, described meeting her in September 1602 to the English diplomat George Nicholson and in a letter to Sir Robert Cecil. She showed him a letter from Bothwell which boasted how he would wreak vengeance on his Scottish enemies with a new Spanish armada. She wanted the best for her children, not her husband's ideas of revenge. She wanted her two eldest boys to study at the University of Cambridge where they would also be hostages against Bothwell's Spanish plans.

She died in 1640 and was buried at Eckford.

Her children with Stewart included:

- Francis Stewart (b. 1584).
- John Stewart.
- Frederick Stewart
- Henry Stewart
- Elizabeth Stewart (b. 1590), who married James, Master of Cranstoun (appears to have been banished in 1610); they were the parents of William Cranstoun, 3rd Lord Cranstoun.
- Helen Stewart, who married John Macfarlane of that Ilk.
- Jean Stewart, who married Robert Elliot of Redheugh.
- Margaret Stewart, who married Alan Cathcart, 5th Lord Cathcart.

Bothwell and Margaret had dealings with the goldsmith George Heriot over a ring with counterfeit diamonds and a necklace with 80 gold "jerbes" or beads.
