= Ghillie suit =

Type of camouflage clothing

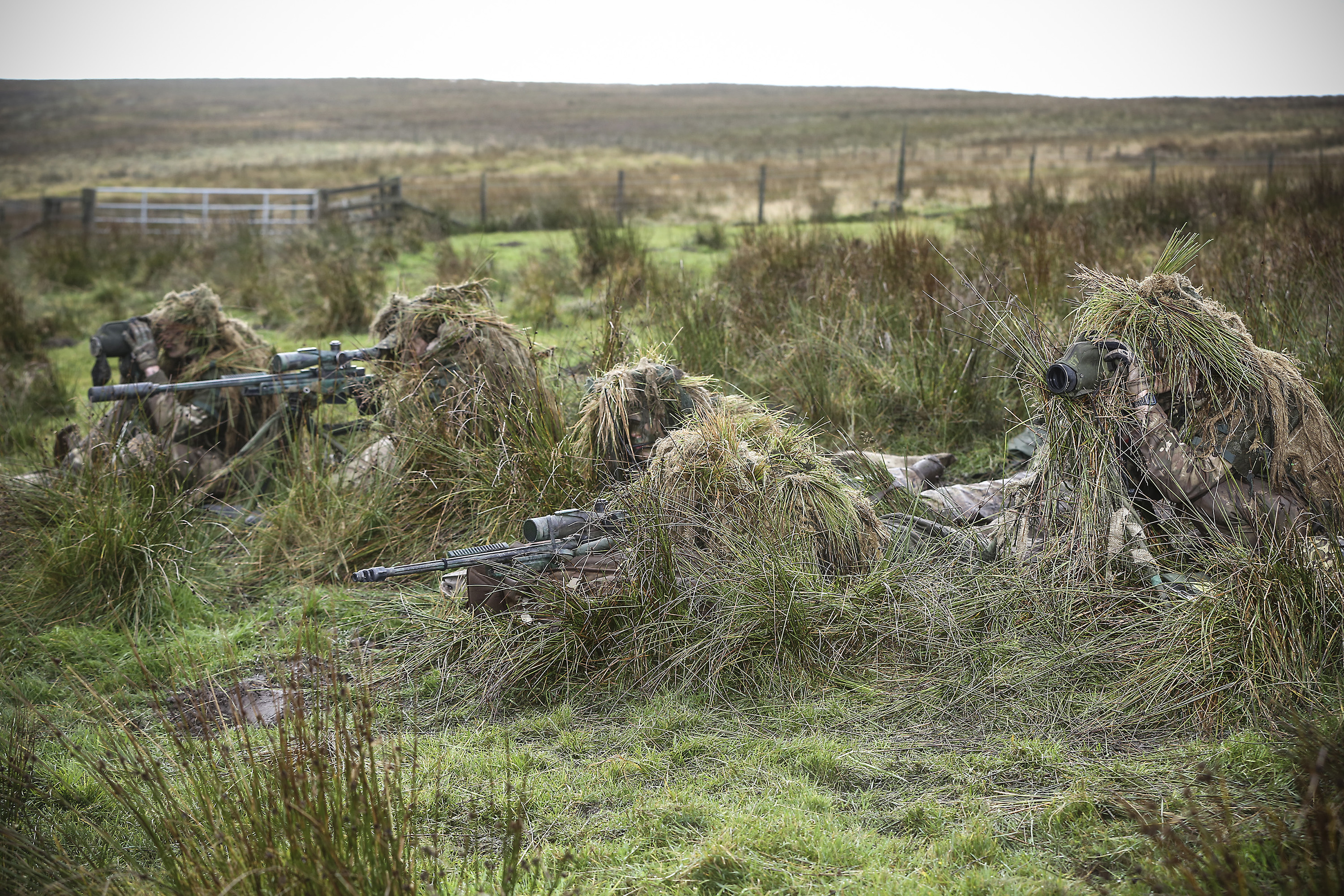
British snipers from No. 34 Squadron RAF Regiment training in ghillie suits in 2015

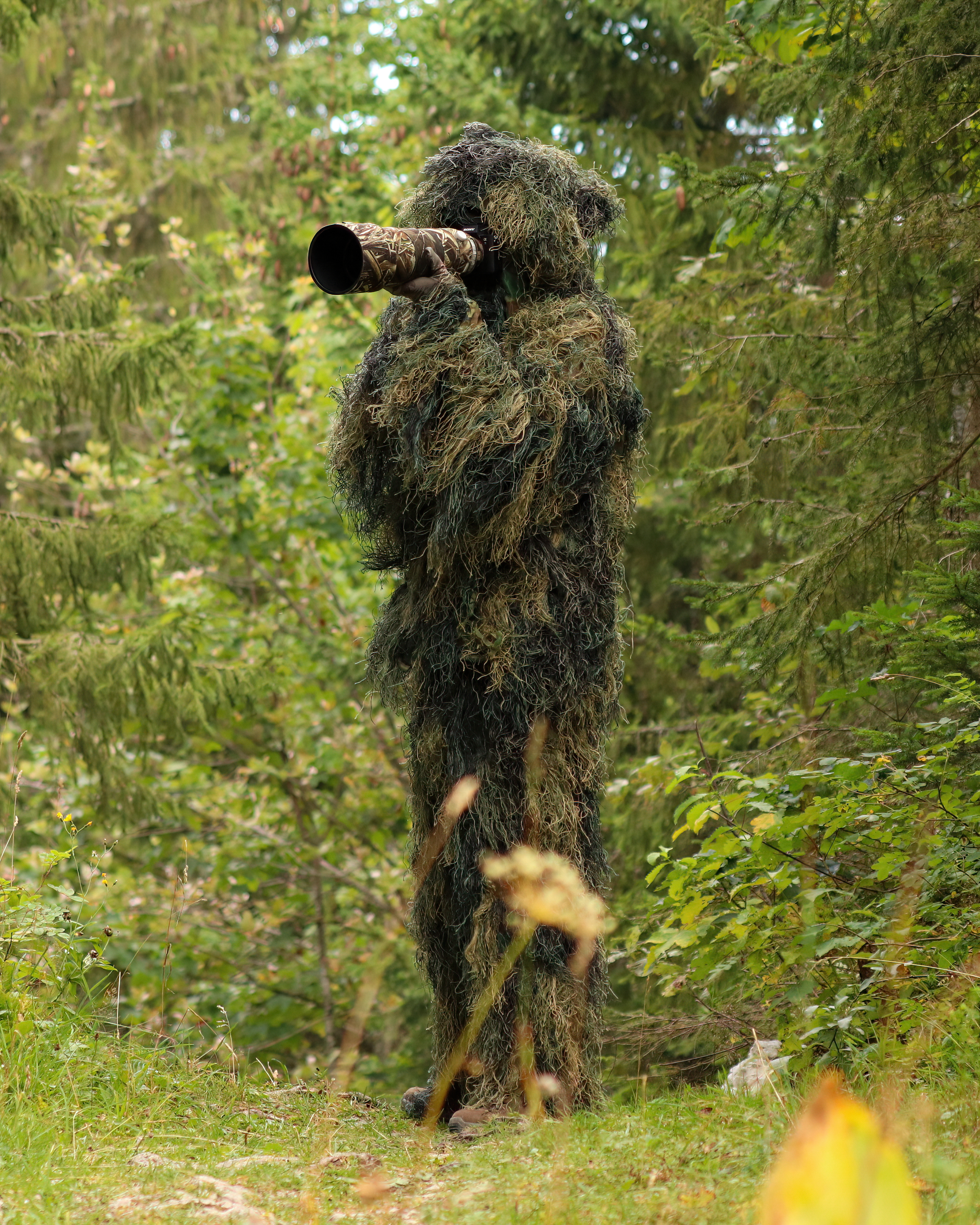
Wildlife photographer in a ghillie suit

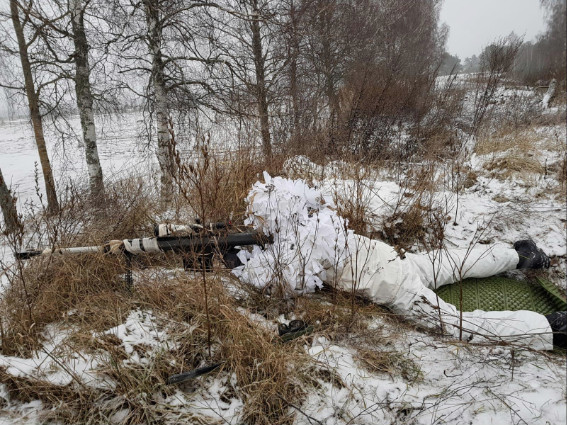
An Italian 9th Alpini 'Aquila' Regiment sniper in a ProApto winter ghillie suit during NATO exercises in 2019

A ghillie suit /ˈɡɪli sut/ is a type of camouflage clothing designed to resemble the background environment – such as foliage. Typically, it is a net or cloth garment covered in loose strips of burlap (hessian), cloth, twine, or jute sometimes made to look like leaves and twigs, and optionally augmented with foliage from the area.

Military personnel, police, hunters, and nature photographers may wear a ghillie suit to blend into their surroundings and to conceal themselves from enemies or targets. The suit gives the wearer's outline a three-dimensional breakup, rather than a linear one. When manufactured correctly, the suit will move in the wind in the same way as surrounding foliage.

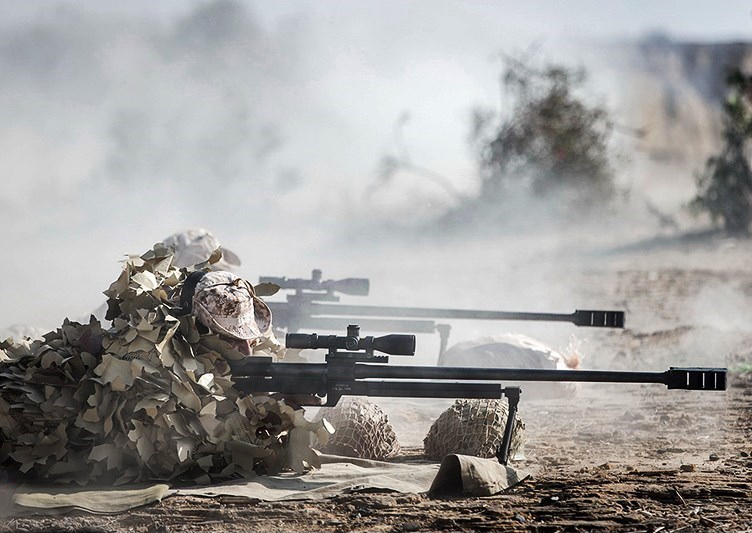
Iranian Navy sniper in a ghillie suit

Hunters and soldiers may use ghillie suits with designs named for rural folk-spirits such as the kikimora of the swamps or the leshy of the forests.

== History ==
The English word ghillie is derived from the Scots Gaelic gille, meaning a young man or older boy who works as an outdoor servant, and is most familiar in reference to those employed to assist sportsmen with recreational shooting or fishing in the Highlands. The term ghillie suit may be a reference to the Ghillie Dhu, an earth spirit in Scottish mythology clothed in leaves and moss.

The Lovat Scouts, a Scottish Highland regiment formed by Simon Fraser, 14th Lord Lovat during the Second Boer War, is the first known military unit to use ghillie suits and in 1916 went on to become the British Army's first sniper unit. The Lovat Scouts were initially recruited from Scottish Highland estate workers, especially professional stalkers and gamekeepers.

Similar sniper outfits in the Australian Army are nicknamed yowie suit, named for their resemblance to the yowie, a mythical hominid similar to the yeti and bigfoot which is said to live in the Australian wilderness.

== Technical and safety considerations ==
Although highly effective, conventional ghillie suits (made in fabric or 3D leafsuits) are for many situations where camouflage is useful. They tend to be very heavy and hot. Even in moderate climates, the temperature inside the ghillie suit can reach over 50 °C (122 °F). The burlap is also flammable, unless treated with fire retardant, so the wearer may be at increased risk from ignition sources such as smoke grenades or white phosphorus. Moreover, conventional ghillie suits and 3D leafsuits are made using fabric, so they retain water, and this dramatically increases weight. Conventional ghillie suits are not designed to camouflage in the IR spectrum. Fabric strips, especially of coarse material like burlap, readily snag on thorns, twigs, and barbed wire.

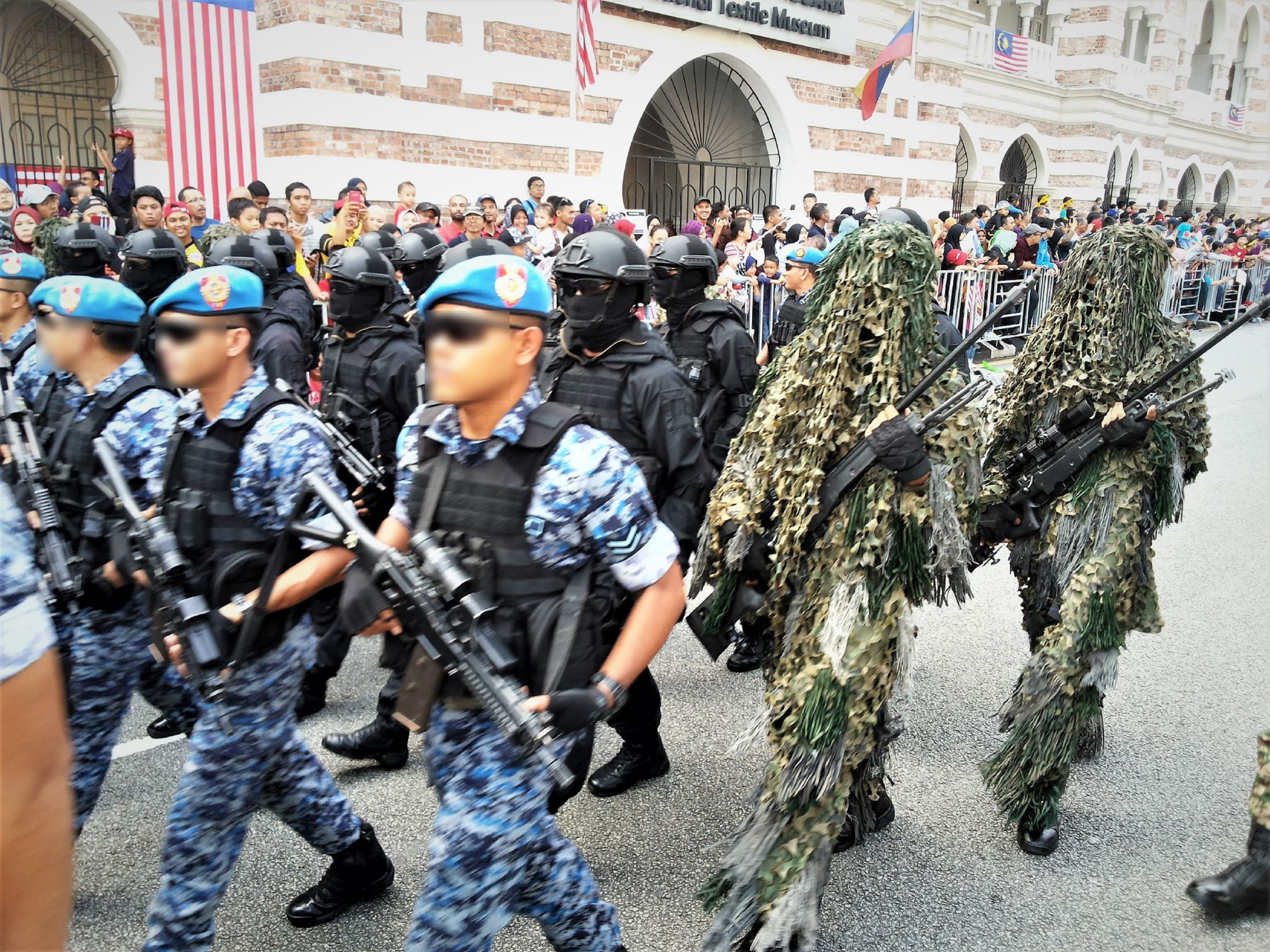
Malaysian soldiers in ghillie suits marching alongside other soldiers

To enhance safety, the US Army Soldier Systems Center has developed an inherently fire-resistant, self extinguishing fabric to replace jute or burlap. This material was field tested in late 2007 at the Sniper School at Fort Benning and has been standard issue since June 2008.

Ghillie suits also have disadvantages in cold environments, as they can get soaked, risking hypothermia.

== Criminal use ==
Civilians have, on rare occasions, purchased ghillie suits to commit violent crimes (other than unlawful hunting). In 2017, an Australian man was arrested after having committed sexual assault while wearing a ghillie suit.
