= Ball Baronets of Blofield (1801) =

Extinct baronetcy

The Ball Baronetcy, of Blofield in the County of Norfolk, was created in the Baronetage of the United Kingdom on 24 June 1801 for the naval commander and colonial administrator Alexander Ball. The title became extinct on the death of the second Baronet in 1874.

== Ball baronets, of Blofield (1801) ==
- Sir Alexander John Ball, 1st Baronet (1757–1809)
- Sir William Keith Ball, 2nd Baronet (1791–1874), died without issue.

Coat of arms of Ball of Blofield
Crest Out of a naval crown a cubit arm erect in naval uniform grasping a hand grenade fired in cross all Proper. Escutcheon Ermine, a lion rampant Sable, G31armed and langued Gules, between two torteaux in chief and in base a hand-grenade exploding Proper.

== Notes ==
Baronetage of the United Kingdom
Preceded by Pepys baronets	Ball baronets of Blofield; 24 June 1801	Succeeded by Bensley baronets
