= Vavasour Baronets of Spaldington (1801) =

Escutcheon of the Vavasour baronets of Spaldington

The Vavasour Baronetcy, of Spaldington in the County of York, was created in the Baronetage of the United Kingdom on 20 March 1801 for Henry Vavasour. The title became extinct on the death of the third Baronet in 1912. This was the premier baronetcy in the Baronetage.

== Vavasour baronets, of Spaldington (1801) ==
- Sir Henry Vavasour, 1st Baronet (died 1813)
- Sir Henry Maghull Mervin Vavasour, 2nd Baronet (1768–1838)
- Sir Henry Mervin Vavasour, 3rd Baronet (1814–1912)

Baronetage of the United Kingdom
Preceded by no earlier creation in the baronetage	Vavasour baronets of Spaldington; 20 March 1801	Succeeded by Milnes baronets
