= Inglis Baronets of Cramond (1687) =

Escutcheon of the Inglis baronets of Cramond

The Inglis Baronetcy, of Cramond, Edinburgh, was created in the Baronetage of Nova Scotia with remainder to heirs male whatsoever, on 22 March 1687 for James Inglis.

The Patent is recorded in the Great Seal register at NRS C2/70/288 with remainder being to the "heredes mascules in perpetuum" or "heirs male in perpetuity" of the 1st Baronet. The family moved from Cramond Tower to Cramond House in the 18th century.

== Inglis of Cramond, Edinburgh (22 March 1687) ==
- Sir James Inglis, 1st Baronet (1660–1688)
- Sir John Inglis, 2nd Baronet (1683–1771)
- Sir Adam Inglis, 3rd Baronet (1714–1772)
- Sir John Inglis, 4th Baronet (c.1718–1799)
- Sir Patrick Inglis, 5th Baronet (d.s.p. on 24 Nov. 1817). Lived at Sunnyside. Painted by Henry Raeburn.

The title became dormant on the death of the fifth Baronet in 1817. On 4 December 2018 the thirteenth Baronet proved his succession and was entered on the Official Roll of the Baronetage.

- Sir William St Clair Inglis, 13th Baronet (born 1942), succeeded 1970, claim admitted on 4 December 2018
