= Inglis Baronets of Milton Bryan (1801) =

Escutcheon of the Inglis baronets of Milton Bryan

The Inglis Baronetcy, of Milton Bryan, Bedfordshire, was created in the Baronetage of the United Kingdom on 6 June 1801 for Hugh Inglis.

== Inglis of Milton Bryan, Beds (6 June 1801) ==
- Sir Hugh Inglis, 1st Baronet (1744–1820)
- Sir Robert Harry Inglis, 2nd Baronet (1786–1855)

Baronetage of the United Kingdom
Preceded by Milnes baronets	Inglis baronets of Milton Bryan; 6 June 1801	Succeeded by De Saumarez baronets
