= Sir Hector Mackenzie, 4th Baronet =

Scottish landowner and baronet (1758–1826)

Sir Hector Mackenzie, 4th Baronet of Gairloch (September 1758-26 April 1826) was a Scottish landowner and baronet. He succeeded his father Sir Alexander on 13 April 1770. He held the office of Lord-Lieutenant of Ross-shire.

The Mackenzies of Gairloch were clan leaders in the traditional sense and were known for their attachment to their tenants. During the Highland Clearances of the 19th century, Sir Hector Mackenzie and his sons Sir Francis and Dr. John Mackenzie refused to evict a single tenant, despite the estate running at a loss. As a result, evicted Highlanders from other communities came to live in the area and has caused Gairloch to maintain a thriving community to the present day.

== Family ==
Sir Hector's first marriage to Cochrane Chalmers was without issue. He married his second wife Christian Henderson, daughter of William Henderson, on 9 May 1796. They had the following children:

- William Mackenzie (died 1858)
- Colonel Hector Mackenzie
- Roderick Mackenzie
- Sir Francis Mackenzie of Gairloch, 5th Baronet (3 Jul 1798-2 Jun 1843)
- Dr. John Mackenzie of Eilenach (1803-18 Dec 1886)

== See also ==
- Gairloch baronets

Baronetage of Nova Scotia
Preceded by Alexander Mackenzie	Baronet (of Gairloch); 1770–1826	Succeeded by Francis Mackenzie
