= Scotstarvit Tower =

Coordinates: 56°17′22.55″N 3°1′1.46″W

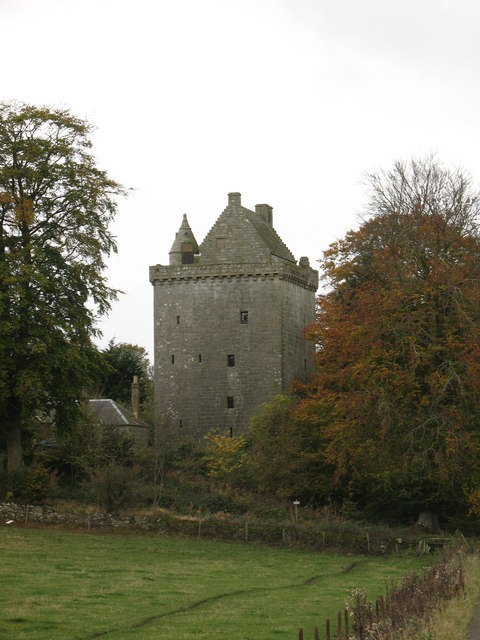
Scotstarvit Tower

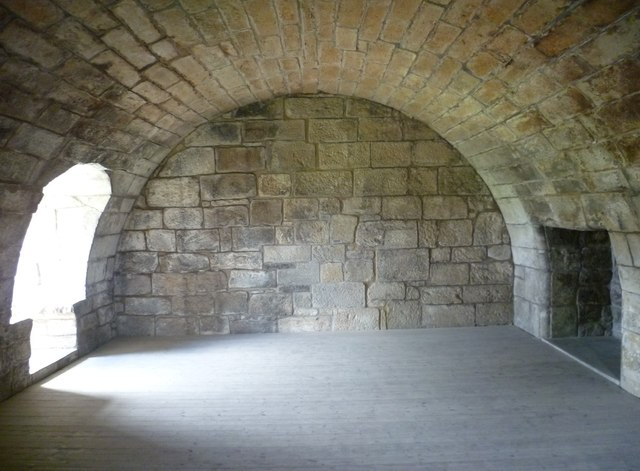
Interior, Scotstarvit Tower

Scotstarvit Tower is a tower house in Fife, Scotland. It is situated 2 miles (3.2 km) south of Cupar, between Tarvit Hill and Walton Hill, south of the River Eden, and west of the A916 road.

== History ==
The six-storey L-plan tower, still largely intact, was built in the third quarter of the 16th century by the Inglis family. It was bought, in 1611, by Sir John Scot, author of the satirical The Staggering State of the Scots' Statesmen. Scot rebuilt the tower in the 1620s. Scotstarvit later passed to the Wemyss family, and in 1948 it was placed in the guardianship of the National Trust for Scotland, and it is now in the care of Historic Environment Scotland. The castle is a Scheduled Ancient Monument.

Major General John Scott inherited the tower from his father David Scott in 1766 and died here in 1775.

== See also ==
- List of places in Fife
- Hill of Tarvit
