= Branxholme Castle =

Castle in Scottish Borders, Scotland

Coordinates: 55°23′45″N 2°50′50″W

Branxholme Castle is a five-storey tower at Branxholme, about 3 miles south-west of Hawick in the Borders region of Scotland.

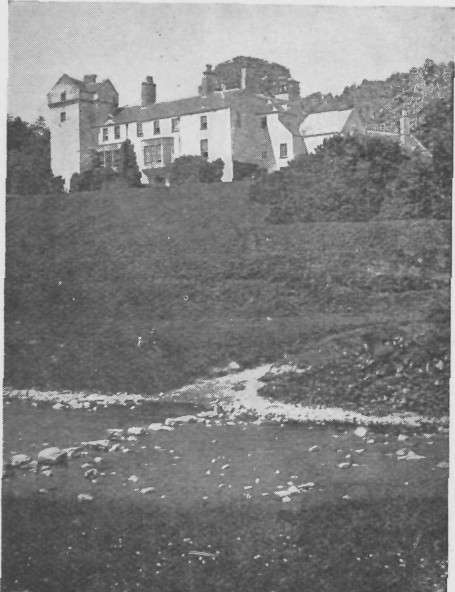
Image of Branxholm Tower from Robert Naylor and John Naylor, "From John O'Groats to Land's End." Project Gutenberg EBook #14415

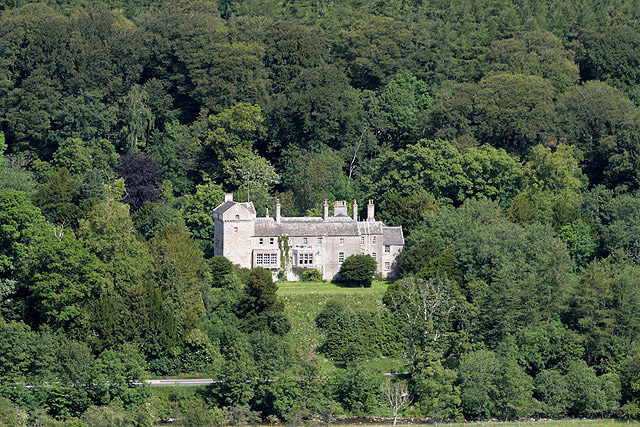
Branxholme Castle, 2011

== History ==
The present castle is on land owned by the Clan Scott since 1420. The Earl of Northumberland burned the first castle in 1532. The rebuilt castle held out against the English in the War of the Rough Wooing in 1547. In January 1548 English observers noted that cannon would be needed to capture Branxholme.

In 1570 the Scotts themselves slighted and burnt the castle. On 20 April 1570, an English army under the Earl of Sussex and Lord Hunsdon arrived and Branxholm was described as "a very strong house and well set, and very pleasant gardens and orchards about it." They completed the work of demolition with gunpowder.

In 1571 Sir Walter Scott of Buccleuch commenced rebuilding and his widow Margaret Douglas completed the work in October 1576. The Scotts were during these troubled years frequently the Wardens of the Middle March. The castle was extensively remodelled by William Burn in 1837 for the 5th Duke of Buccleuch. The Branksome Hall School in Toronto, Canada, is named after this castle, and has been given a replica of a mantle from the castle.

In 2017 Branxholme Castle was reoccupied after twelve years of abandonment. It was renovated by Carol Shanley and Brian Desport into a family home and a business that operates as a wedding venue, a spa, a café, and guest lodging.

== Description ==
Branxholme castle consists of a sixteenth-century tower house of five storeys, altered and incorporated in a later mansion. There are vaulted chambers in the basement, and a newel stair.

== Poetic references ==
Walter Scott, 1st Lord Scott of Buccleuch was the “bauld Buccleuch” of the Border ballad Kinmont Willie. The narrative poem The Lay of the Last Minstrel by the poet and novelist Sir Walter Scott celebrates the success of Baron Henry of Cranston in securing the hand of Lady Margaret of Branksome Hall.

== See also ==
- List of places in the Scottish Borders
- List of places in Scotland

== Bibliography ==
- The Castles of Scotland, Martin Coventry, Goblinshead, 2001
- Scotland’s Castles, Hubert Fenwick, Robert Hale Ltd, 1976
