= Cramond Tower =

Castle in City of Edinburgh, Scotland

- Edinburgh, Scotland
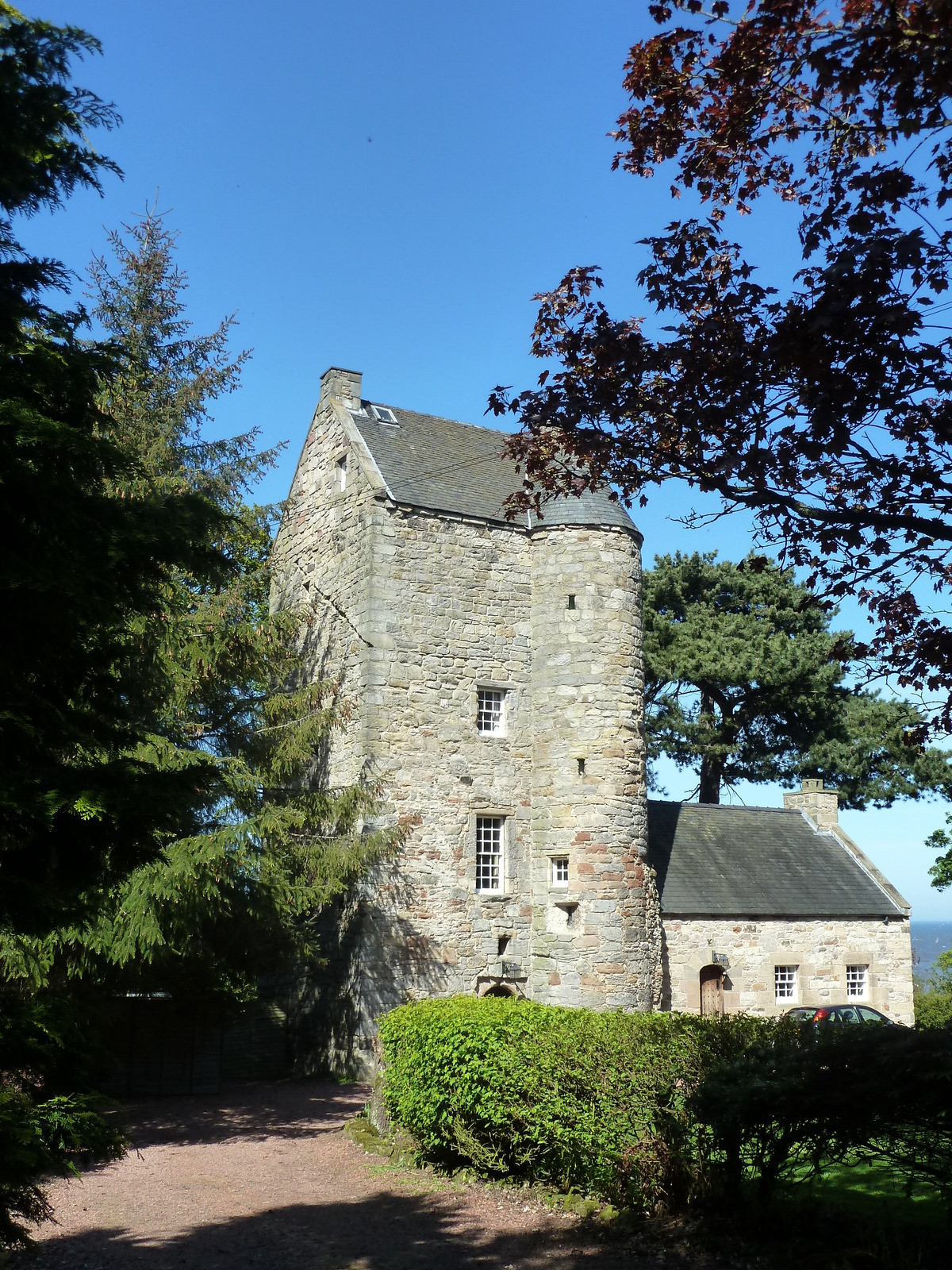
- Cramond Tower

Site information
- Owner: private residence

Listed Building – Category B
- Official name: 4 Kirk Cramond, Cramond Tower
- Designated: 14 July 1966; 60 years ago
- Reference no.: LB28018

Location
- Coordinates: 55.9782368°N 3.2976298°W

Site history
- Built: 15th century

Cramond Tower is a fifteenth-century tower house in the village of Cramond to the north-west of Edinburgh, Scotland.

== History ==
The area around the Tower has had a human settlement since the time of Ancient Rome, and there are relics from that time in the area. The Tower was probably built in the late 15th or early 16th century, primarily as a defensive feature, although it could have been built earlier, and may have been mentioned in 1409. It was at one stage part of the bishop of Dunkeld's summer residence.

It became the property of James Inglis, an Edinburgh merchant, in 1622. He repurposed the tower to make it more comfortable for occupation, adding and enlarging windows and creating internal recesses to increase the available living space. His grandson moved to the nearby Cramond House in 1680, and the tower was abandoned for the next 300 years.

It was portrayed as a romantic ruin by James Skene in 1837, and was in a poor state of preservation by the middle of the twentieth century. In the 1960s, the City of Edinburgh Council put a concrete cap on the roof and cleared the vegetation.

In 1978, it was acquired by Eric Jamieson, an amateur antiquarian. Between 1979 and 1981, it was restored by architects Robert Hurd & Partners into a private residence.

It was damaged by a fire in 2011.

== Description ==
The castle is a nearly square four-storey tower house, around 25 feet (7.6 m) on each side and with walls up to 5 feet (1.5 m) thick. In the south-east corner is a round staircase that protrudes from the building. Currently, the tower has a store at ground level, a living room on the first floor, kitchen on the second, and bedrooms and bathrooms on the third and fourth floors. A pitched roof has been re-erected as part of the restoration. In the 1990s, a stone extension was added on the east side.

It is a category B listed building.

== Archaeology ==
Excavations between 1976 & 1981 and 1987 & 1988 found medieval and post-medieval material. They also identified building foundations to the west of the tower which are believed to be the outbuildings identified in the 19th century. Because of its proximity to Cramond Roman Fort some Roman amphorae and mortaria, as well as a defensive ditch for the fort, were also found.
