= Sir John Inglis, 2nd Baronet =

John Inglis
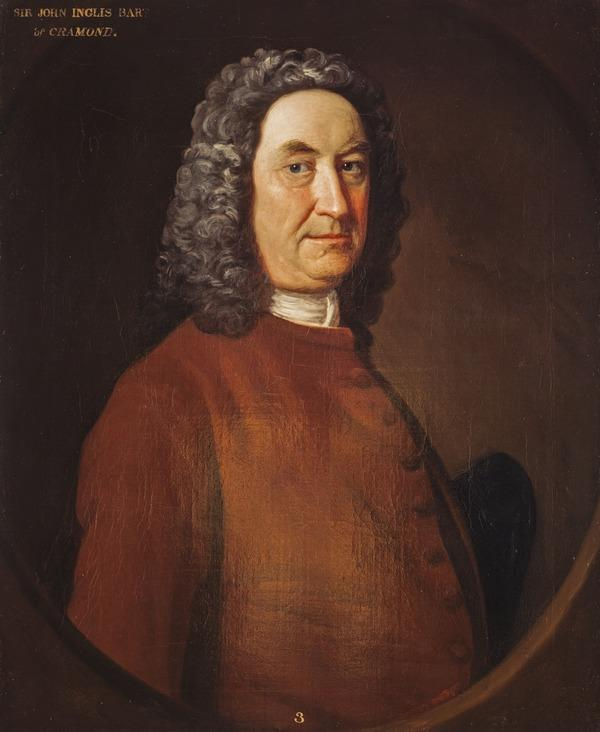
- Inglis by Allan Ramsay
- Born: September 1683
- Died: 27 January 1770 (aged 57)
- Political party: Whig
- Children: Charles, 3 other sons, and 5 daughters.
- Parent: James Inglis

Sir John Inglis, 2nd Baronet (September 1683 – 3 March 1771) was Postmaster General for Scotland, the son and heir of Sir James Inglis, 1st Baronet of Cramond, Edinburghshire by his spouse Anne, daughter of Sir Patrick Houstoun, 1st Baronet of that Ilk. He succeeded his father in 1688.

== Early life ==
His father Sir James Inglis, 1st Baronet built Cramond House north-west of Edinburgh around 1680 and John was born there in September 1683, being baptised at Cramond Kirk on 23 September.

== Career ==
In 1717, he succeeded James Anderson WS (who had held the post since 1715) as Deputy Postmaster General (the role of Postmaster General at that point being held by the monarch). The physical handling of the mail was handled by a Mr Main or Mein from a property north of the Old Tolbooth on the Royal Mile in Edinburgh, being relocated to Parliament Close and then to the Cowgate in the reign of George III. In 1741 Inglis's role passed to Hamilton of Innerwick.

Sir John was a member of Scotland's Whig establishment. His brother-in-law was John Cockburn of Ormiston and as a member of the Ormiston Society he took an interest in agricultural improvement. He planted trees around Cramond House and in 1747 he consolidated the glebe. He also encouraged the Cramond iron mills. He was foreman of the jury in the trial of Captain John Porteous.

== Personal life ==
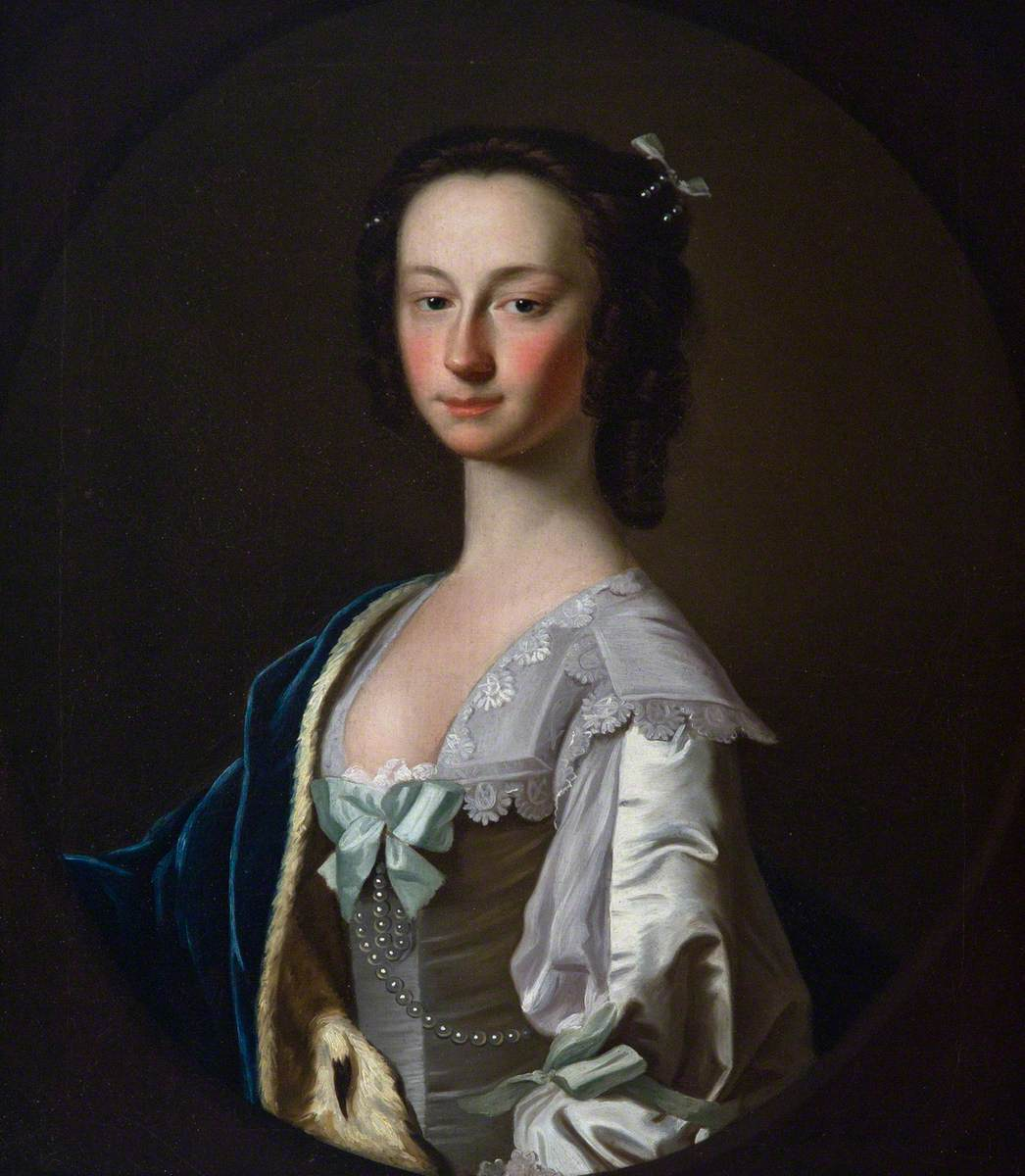
Portrait of his daughter, Margaret, by Allan Ramsay, 1747

On 24 June 1708, Sir John married his cousin, Anne Cockburn (d. 1772), a daughter of Adam Cockburn of Ormiston, Lord Justice Clerk. Together, they had four sons and five daughters, including:

- Sir Adam Inglis, 3rd Baronet (1714–1772), d.s.p.
- Sir John Inglis, 4th Baronet (c. 1716–1799)
- Margaret Inglis (1720–1747), who married John Erskine of Dun, a son of David Erskine, Lord Dun.
- Patrick Inglis, a merchant in Edinburgh.
- Rear-Admiral Charles Inglis (1731–1791)

Sir John died on 3 March 1771 and was succeeded in the baronetcy by his eldest son, Adam

Baronetage of Nova Scotia
Preceded by James Inglis	Baronet (of Cramond); 1688–1771	Succeeded by Adam Inglis
