= Archaeological and Anthropological Sciences =

Peer-reviewed scientific journal

- Discipline: Archaeology, Anthropology
- Language: English
- Edited by: Elisabetta Gliozzo, Yannis Bassiakos, Claudio Tuniz, Joachim Burger, Nicholas J. Conard, Stephen Shennan, Joy McCorriston, Carolina Mallol

Publication details
- History: 2009-present
- Publisher: Springer Science+Business Media
- Open access: Hybrid
- Impact factor: 2.2 (2022)

Standard abbreviations
- ISO 4: Archaeol. Anthropol. Sci.

Indexing
- ISSN: 1866-9557 (print); 1866-9565 (web)
- LCCN: 2009268509
- OCLC no.: 352926390

Links
- Journal homepage

Archaeological and Anthropological Sciences, established in 2009, is a peer-reviewed scientific journal that publishes articles on various aspects of anthropological and archaeological issues, including geoarchaeology, geochronology and palaeoanthropology. It is published by Springer Science+Business Media.

== Abstracting and indexing ==
The journal is abstracted and indexed in relevant scientific databases, including the Arts and Humanities Citation Index,Social Sciences Citation Index, Science Citation Index Expanded, and Scopus.

According to the Journal Citation Reports, the journal has a 2022 impact factor of 2.2.
