= William Inglis (Border knight) =

Scottish knight of the 14th century

Sir William Inglis was a Scottish knight. He is remembered for his role in a Border foray in 1395 where he answered the challenge of an English champion, Sir Thomas Struthers, and killed him in single combat. As a reward for his prowess King Robert III made Sir William Inglis, a grant of the barony of Manor, which seems to have included the whole Manor Valley, a glen running south from the River Tweed about three miles west of Peebles, and known to readers of Sir Walter Scott as the scene of The Black Dwarf.

The earliest known home of Sir William Inglis was at Branxholme on the River Teviot in Roxburghshire.
