= Susanna Harriot Hope =

Susanna Hope
- Born: 13 June 1768; Derby
- Died: 1839 (aged 70–71); Westminster
- Other names: Susanna Harriot Gordon
- Known for: subject of painting and scandalous divorce
- Spouses: Joseph Seymour Biscoe; Robert Gordon
- Children: Mary Biscoe

Susanna Harriot Hope; Susanna Harriot Gordon or Susanna Biscoe (13 June 1768 – 1839) was a British subject of a Joseph Wright painting and a party to a divorce.

== Life ==
Hope was born in Derby in 1768. Her father, Charles Hope, was the rector of All Saints church in Derby. She was painted by a family friend Joseph Wright of Derby not in contemporary dress but in a 17th-century costume. This painting is extant and was sold at Christie's in 2009.

Hope married Joseph Seymour Biscoe on 22 May 1786, with the consent of her father as she was not yet 21. Biscoe's uncle was Edward Seymour, 9th Duke of Somerset. And their marriage appears happy for about seven years. They had a daughter named Mary. Mary was to eventually marry the prospective M.P. Sir Robert Inglis, 2nd Baronet in 1807.

Her husband spent more time in hunting than at home and whilst he was out his Hope began an affair with Robert Gordon who was a family friend and the owner of the house where they were staying. Her husband would go out hunting early each morning but Gordon would not go out until he thought that Biscoe would return. Servants reported that Mrs Biscoe would go out riding where she would meet Gordon, but Gordon would see her home but never enter the house with her. Gordon eloped with Mrs Biscoe on 21 October 1794.

Hope's husband did not file for divorce but instead sued for £10,000 damages in December 1794. The caused scandal as Hope was by then living with Gordon. Hope did not appear but in her absence her husband was granted £5,000 for the "criminal conversation". It was said that although this was a large amount of money, Gordon could easily afford to pay this amount. After the trial the proceedings were published under the title "The Trial of Mrs. Biscoe for Adultery with Robert Gordon, Etc".

Hope's marriage to Biscoe was eventually dissolved by act of parliament in 1795. Biscoe married Stephanie Law in 1799. She was the daughter of Dr John Law the archdeacon of Rochester.

She died in Westminster in 1839, but she was described as a widow of Brighton.
