= Sir Robert Inglis, 2nd Baronet =

British politician (1786–1855)

The Right Honourable Sir Robert Inglis Bt FRS
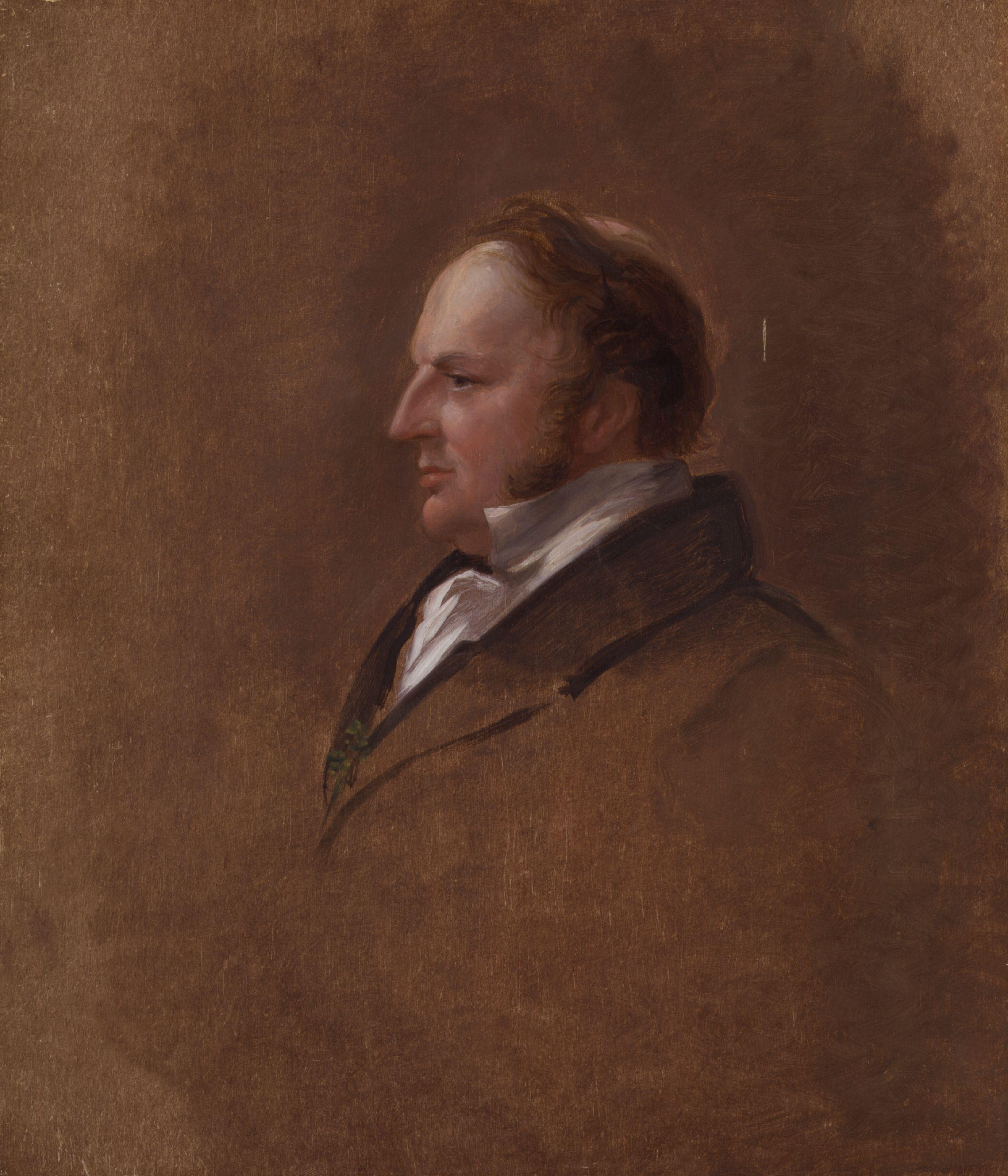
- Sir Robert Inglis by George Hayter

Member of Parliament for Oxford University
- In office 1829–1854
- Preceded by: Robert Peel
- Succeeded by: Sir William Heathcote, Bt

Member of Parliament for Ripon
- In office 1828–1829

Member of Parliament for Dundalk
- In office 1824–1826

Personal details
- Born: 12 January 1786 Snelston, Derbyshire, Kingdom of Great Britain
- Died: 5 May 1855 (aged 69) Belfast, United Kingdom of Great Britain and Ireland
- Resting place: Ballylesson
- Party: Tory/Ultra-Tory
- Education: Winchester College; Christ Church, Oxford

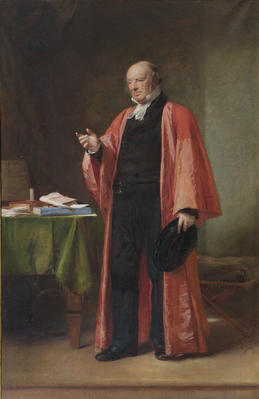
Portrait of Inglis

Sir Robert Harry Inglis, 2nd Baronet, FRS (12 January 1786 – 5 May 1855) was a British Conservative politician, noted for his staunch high church views.

== Family ==
He was the son of Sir Hugh Inglis, a minor politician and MP for Ashburton (1802–1806). In 1807 he married Mary Briscoe who was the daughter of John Briscoe and Susanna Harriot Hope whose marriage had ended in scandal.

== Political career ==
Robert succeeded to his father's baronetcy in 1820, and served as MP for Dundalk 1824–1826, Ripon 1828–1829 and Oxford University from 1829 to 1854. He was appointed High Sheriff of Bedfordshire for 1824.

Inglis was strongly opposed to measures which, in his view, weakened the Anglican Church. He spoke strongly and successfully against the Catholic Relief Bill of 1847, claiming it would, if passed, weaken England’s Protestantism and allow Catholicism to grow (Cork Examiner, April 1847). When the leading Tory MP Robert Peel forced a by-election at Oxford University in 1829 on the issue of Catholic Emancipation, Inglis resigned from Ripon and with support from Ultra-Tories defeated Peel.

When Robert Grant, MP for Inverness Burghs, petitioned for Jewish relief in 1830, Inglis was violently opposed. Inglis alleged that the Jews were an alien people, with no allegiance to England, and that to admit Jews to parliament would "separate Christianity itself from the State." He also alleged that if they were admitted to parliament "within seven years...Parliamentary Reform would be carried." Inglis was joined in his public opposition by the Chancellor of the Exchequer, Henry Goulburn, and the Solicitor General and future Lord Chancellor, Sir Edward Sugden. Although the Jews were not emancipated fully until 1858, Parliamentary Reform occurred in 1832, just two years later. Inglis also likened Buddhism to "idolatry" in connection with the British colony of Ceylon (now Sri Lanka) during a debate over the relationship of "Buddhist priests" to the British colonial government in 1852.

In 1845 he broke again with Sir Robert Peel and opposed the Maynooth Grant, which would have granted a permanent yearly £26,000 subsidy to the Catholic Maynooth seminary. Other opponents included, oddly enough, John Bright, William Gladstone and Benjamin Disraeli, although on different grounds.

Inglis spoke with compassion about the plight of the Irish people during the Great Famine of the 1840s. He was well informed about the situation 'on the ground' and drew information from reports from the Society of Friends which give an accurate picture of Ireland's suffering. He did not hesitate to criticise absentee landlords, likening them to the absentee of Maria Edgeworth's novel, Castle Rackrent. Inglis seems to have been a conscientious public representative. He served as an M.P. for three different constituencies over almost thirty years and in that time he spoke 1,327 times. See Hansard for his speeches, particularly the speech of 1 February 1847.

In 1851, when Lord Stanley (who became the Earl of Derby later that year) attempted to form a protectionist administration, Inglis was offered the presidency of the Board of Control, which he accepted initially, only to withdraw a few days later. A major activity of Inglis's political career was the chairing of the select committee that controlled the House of Commons Library, of which he was a member for 14 years. However, his rather narrow view of its scope was overturned by Sir Robert Peel in 1850. He was made a privy counsellor in 1854, and died the next year, at the age of 69. On his death the baronetcy became extinct.

Inglis's Journals are in the Canterbury Cathedral library and archives.

== Notes ==
Parliament of the United Kingdom
Preceded by George Hartopp-Fleetwood	Member of Parliament for Dundalk; 1824–1826	Succeeded by Charles Barclay
Preceded by Lancelot Shadwell; Louis Hayes Petit	Member of Parliament for Ripon; 1828–1829; With: Louis Hayes Petit	Succeeded by George Spence; Louis Hayes Petit
Preceded by Robert Peel	Member of Parliament for Oxford University; 1829–1854; With: Thomas Grimston Estcourt 1829–1847; William Ewart Gladstone 1847–1854	Succeeded by Sir William Heathcote, Bt
Honorary titles
Preceded by Thomas Charles Higgins	High Sheriff of Bedfordshire; 1824–1825	Succeeded by Samuel Bedford Edwards
Baronetage of the United Kingdom
Preceded by Hugh Inglis	Baronet (of Milton Bryan); 1820–1855	Extinct
