= Inglis baronets =

Set index on Inglis baronetcies

There have been three creations of baronetcies with the surname Inglis: two in the Baronetage of Nova Scotia (one initially for surname Mackenzie, both extant as of 2023 (but one vacant); and one in the Baronetage of the United Kingdom that is extinct.

- Inglis Baronets of Cramond (1687)
- Inglis Baronets of Gairloch (1703)
- Inglis Baronets of Milton Bryan (1801)
