= Inglis Baronets of Gairloch (1703) =

Escutcheon of the Inglis baronets of Gairloch

The Inglis (initially Mackenzie) Baronetcy, of Gairloch, Ross-shire, was created in the Baronetage of Nova Scotia for Kenneth Mackenzie, on 22 February 1703. It is now known as Inglis of Glencorse, and the baronetage is listed as vacant.

== Inglis of Gairloch, Ross (22 February 1703) ==
- Sir Kenneth Mackenzie, 1st Baronet (c.1673–1704)
- Sir Alexander Mackenzie, 2nd Baronet (1700–1766)
- Sir Alexander Mackenzie, 3rd Baronet (c.1730–1770)
- Sir Hector Mackenzie, 4th Baronet (1758–1826)
- Sir Francis Alexander Mackenzie, 5th Baronet (1798–1843)
- Sir Kenneth Smith Mackenzie, 6th Baronet (1832–1900)
- Sir Kenneth John Mackenzie, 7th Baronet (1861–1929)
- Sir Hector David Mackenzie, 8th Baronet (1893–1958)
- Sir Maxwell Ian Hector Inglis, 9th Baronet (1903–1974)
- Sir Roderick John Inglis, 10th Baronet (1936–2018)
- Sir Ian Richard Inglis, 11th Baronet (born 1965); name not on the Official Roll of the Baronetage.

The heir apparent is his eldest son Joshua Ben Mackenzie Inglis (born 1990).
