= Hugh Inglis =

Sir Hugh Inglis, 1st Baronet (30 April 1744 – 21 August 1820) was an East Indies merchant and politician.

Inglis went to the East Indies in 1762, and returned in 1775. He was chosen as a Director of the British East India Company (EIC) in 1784, where he served as deputy-chairman in 1796 to 1797 and 1799–1800 and chairman in 1797 to 1798 and 1800 to 1801. He was Chairman of Marine Society in 1798. He was appointed Colonel of the 2nd regiment of Royal East India Volunteers. In June 1801, he was created a baronet. In 1802, he was elected M. P. for Ashburton and held the seat until 1806. Inglis married Catherine Johnson in 1784. She had inherited the Milton Bryan estate, which after her death in 1792 became her husband's property.

Inglis died at his house, in Queen Anne Street, London aged 76. A monument by Chantrey was erected to his memory in Milton Bryan Church.

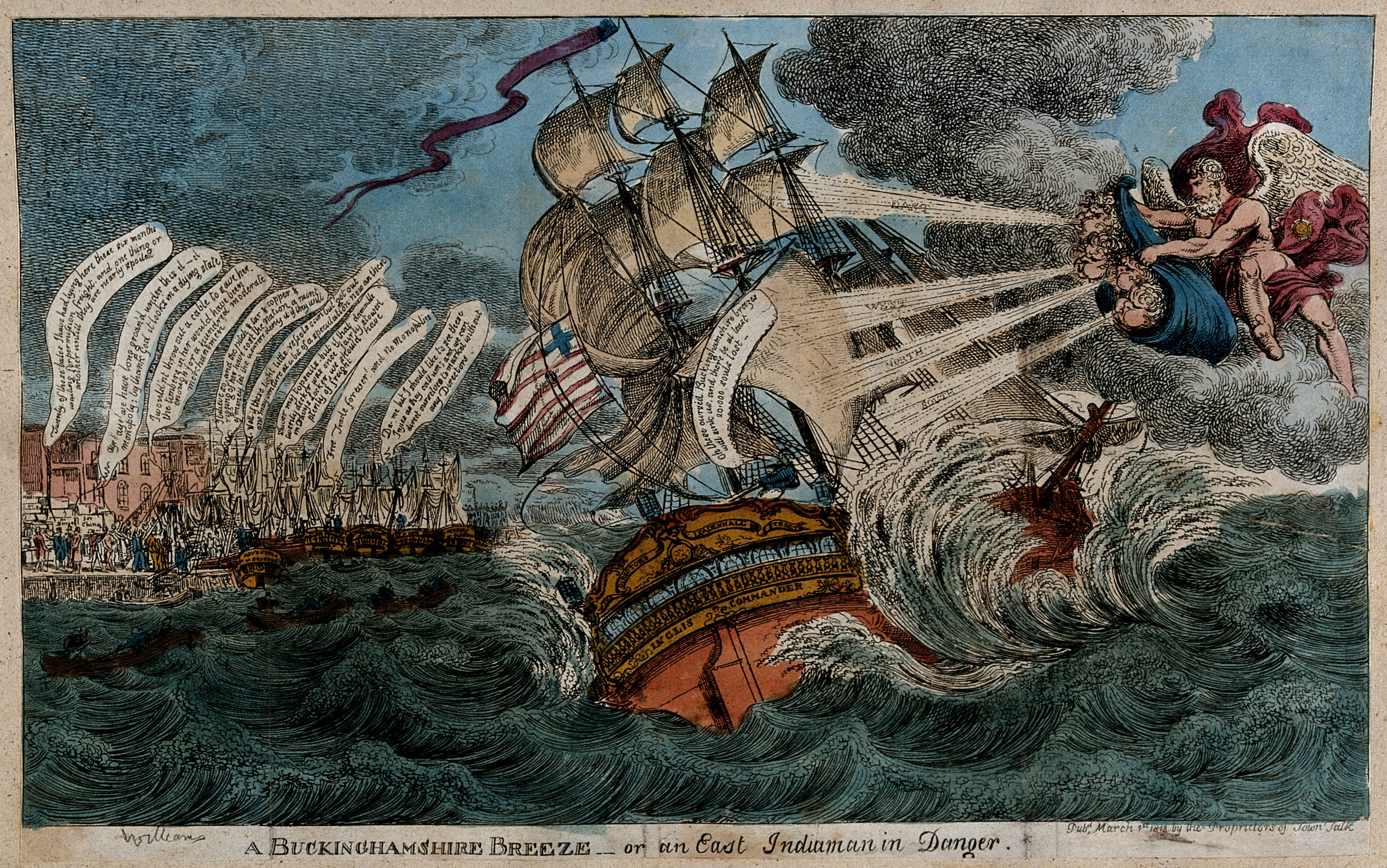
An East Indiaman (ship) buffeted by winds blown by four putt satirises Inglis at the helm of the EIC

== See also ==
- Hugh Inglis (1799 EIC ship) – an East Indiaman that made seven voyages for the EIC between 1800 and 1817.

Parliament of the United Kingdom
Preceded by Walter Palk; Robert Mackreth	Member of Parliament for Ashburton; 1802–1806; With: Walter Palk	Succeeded by Walter Palk; Hon. Gilbert Elliot
Baronetage of the United Kingdom
New creation	Baronet (of Milton Bryan); 1802–1820	Succeeded by Robert Inglis
