= Cramond =

Village and suburb of Edinburgh, Scotland

Coordinates: 55°58.78′N 3°18.04′W

Cramond Village: Scottish Gaelic: Cair Amain
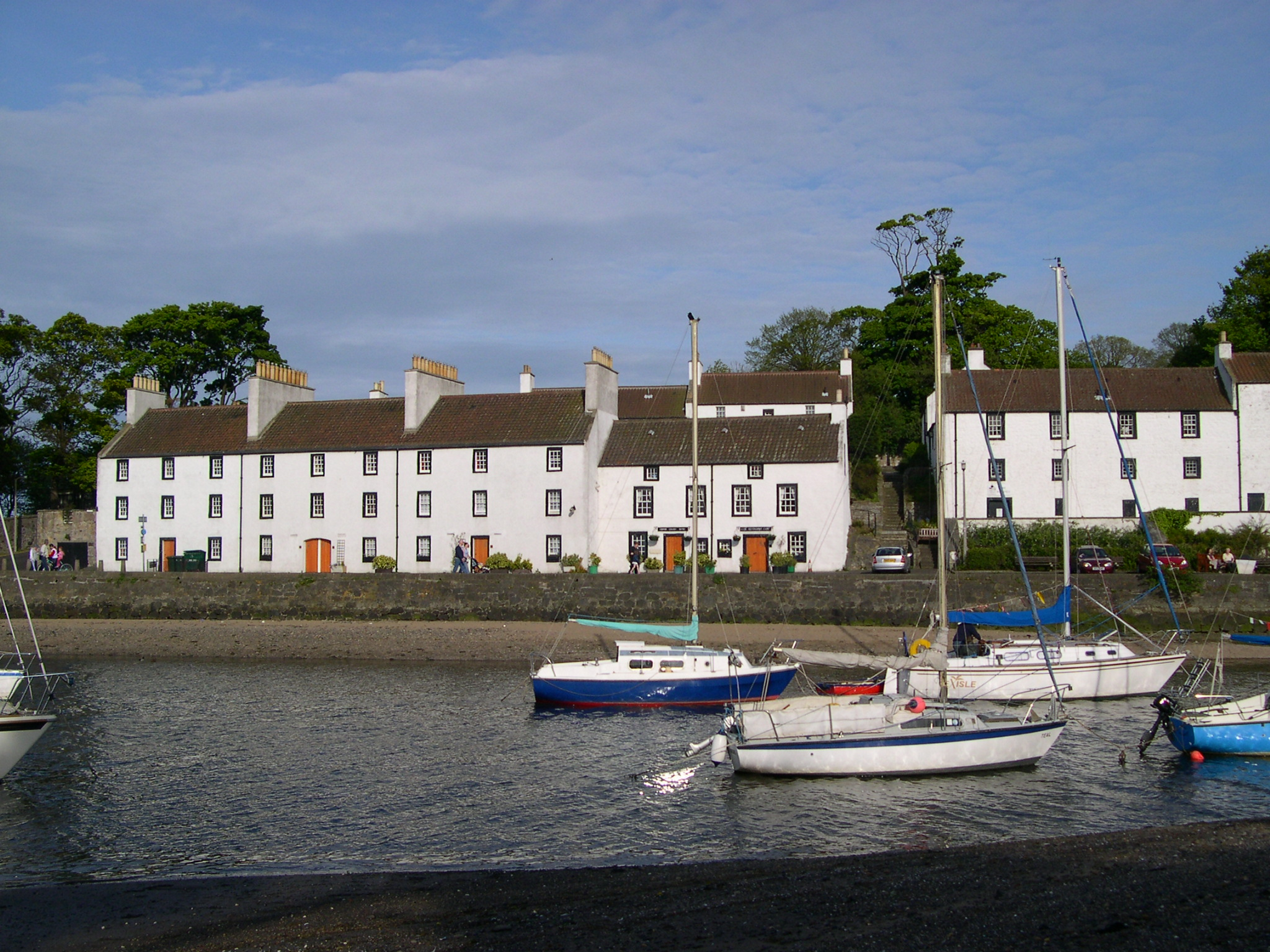
- Cramond Harbour

- Location within the City of Edinburgh council area Location within Scotland
- Population: 13,409 (2024)
- OS grid reference: NT18667629
- Council area: City of Edinburgh
- Country: Scotland
- Sovereign state: United Kingdom
- Post town: EDINBURGH
- Postcode district: EH4
- Dialling code: 0131
- Police: Scotland
- Fire: Scottish
- Ambulance: Scottish
- UK Parliament: Edinburgh West
- Scottish Parliament: Edinburgh Western

Cramond Village (/ˈkræmənd/; Scottish Gaelic: Cair Amain) is a village and suburb in the north-west of Edinburgh, Scotland, at the mouth of the River Almond where it enters the Firth of Forth.

The Cramond area has evidence of Mesolithic, Bronze Age and Roman activity. In modern times, it was the birthplace of the Scottish economist John Law (1671–1729). Cramond was incorporated into the City of Edinburgh by the Edinburgh Boundaries Extension and Tramways Act 1920 (10 & 11 Geo. 5. c. lxxxvii).

== Etymology ==
It was once believed that Cramond Roman Fort was known to the Romans as Alaterva. A stone altar was dug up in the grounds of Cramond House dedicated "To the Alatervan Mothers and the Mothers of the Parade-ground." Early antiquarians interpreted the inscription as referring to the place where the stone was found, but this idea is no longer accepted among scholars, and "Alatervae" is presumably a native name for the deities the Matres and Matronae, perhaps originating with the Tungrian cohort who erected the altar.

In the centuries that followed the end of the Roman occupation, Cramond passed into the hands of the Votadini, who spoke Cumbric, a Brythonic Celtic language, and gave the settlement its name. Cramond is derived from the compound Caer Amon, meaning 'fort on the river', referring to the Roman fort that lay on the River Almond.

== History ==
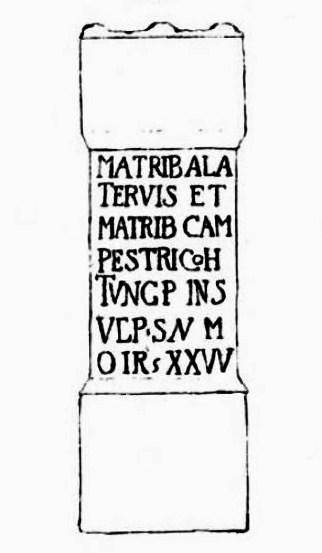
The inscription on the Roman altar dedicated to the Alatervan Mothers and the Mothers of the Parade-ground.

=== Early history ===
==== Pre-Roman ====
Archaeological excavations at Cramond have uncovered evidence of habitation dating to around 8500 BC, making it, for a time, the earliest known site of human settlement in Scotland. The inhabitants of the Mesolithic camp-site were nomadic hunter-gatherers who moved around their territories according to the season of the year. Although no bones survived the acid soil, waste pits and stakeholes that would have supported shelters or windbreaks were excavated. Numerous discarded hazelnut shells, the waste product of the inhabitants' staple food, were found in the pits and used to carbon-date the site. It is thought the site was chosen for its location near the junction of the Firth of Forth and the River Almond, where the rich oyster and mussel beds proved a reliable natural resource. Many microlith stone tools manufactured at the site were found, and pre-date finds of similar style in England.

==== Roman period ====
Around 142, Roman forces arrived at Cramond by order of the Emperor Antoninus Pius, with the task of establishing a fort at the mouth of the River Almond. This fort would guard the eastern flank of the fortified frontier known as the Antonine Wall (named after the Emperor, as with Hadrian's Wall) that the Romans had established across Scotland. Nearly five hundred men worked on the site, building a fort that covered nearly six acres, with a harbour for communication. However, the fort was only inhabited for a short time, perhaps fifteen years, before it was abandoned by the troops who were ordered to retreat south to Hadrian's Wall. Pottery and coins of later date indicate that the fort and harbour were reinhabited and used as a base for the army and navy of the Emperor Septimius Severus, sometime between 208 and 211.

The medieval parish church of Cramond parish (which retains its late medieval western tower in altered form), was built within the Roman fort.

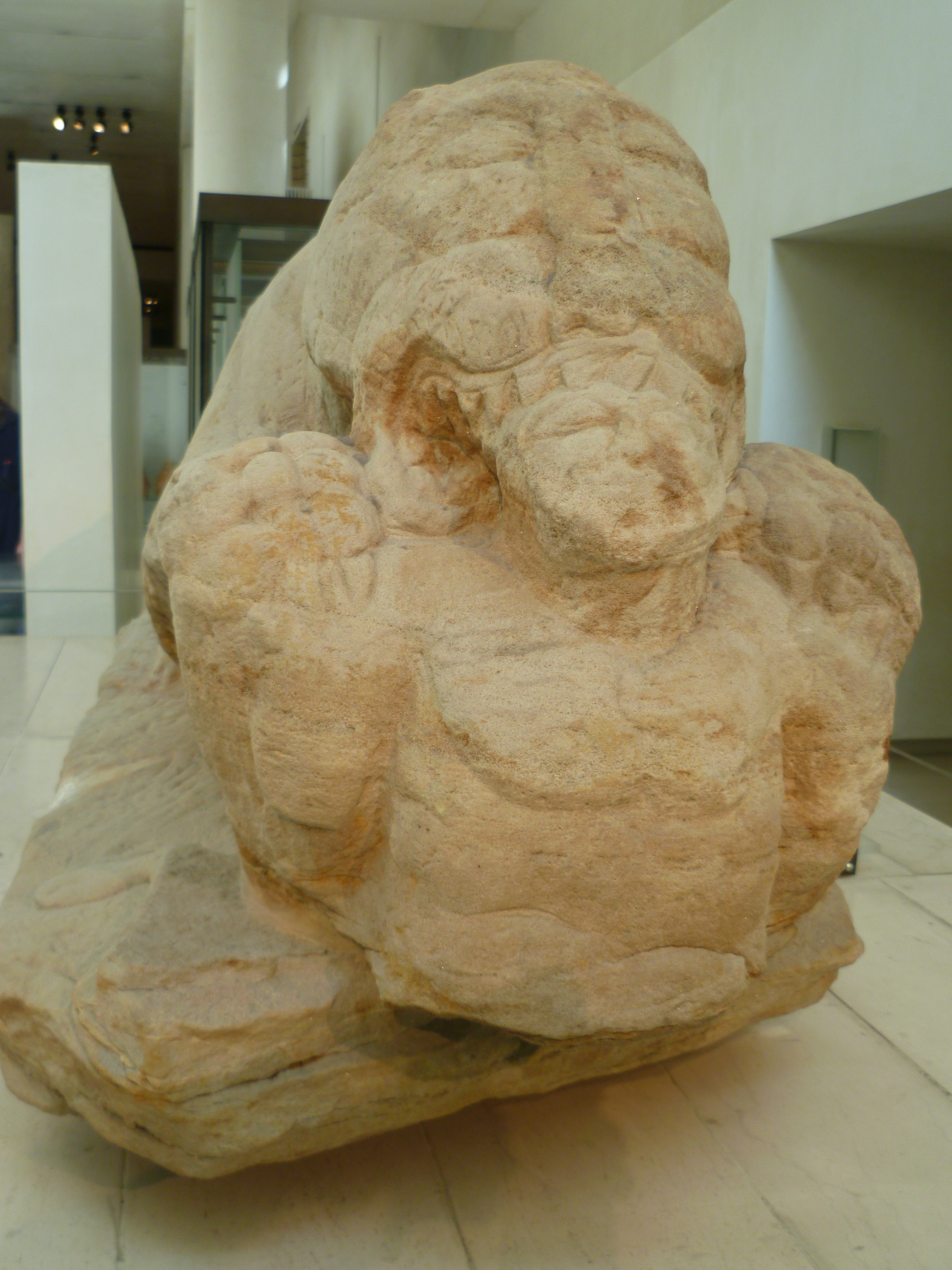
The Cramond Lioness in the National Museum of Scotland, Edinburgh

Though knowledge of the Roman presence at Cramond was recorded afterwards, the remains of the fort itself were only rediscovered in 1954. Substantial archaeological research was carried out upon its discovery to build up a reasonably accurate picture of the site in Roman times. The fort was rectangular in shape, with walls fifteen feet high on all sides. A gatehouse was set in every wall, allowing access in all four directions. Inside, there were barracks, workshops, granaries, headquarters and the commander's house. Later excavations revealed other constructions outside the boundary of the fort, including a bath-house, further industrial workshops and a native settlement.

In 1997, the Cramond Lioness was uncovered in the harbour mud by a local boatman (who received a substantial monetary reward for finding this major antiquity), and was identified as a sandstone statue of a lioness devouring a hapless male figure, probably one of a pair at the tomb of a military commander. After conservation, the statue was put on display in the National Museum of Scotland in Edinburgh. It is one of the most ambitious pieces of Roman sculpture to have survived in Scotland.

==== Medieval period ====
A map showing the parish of Cramond in 1794.

After the departure of the Romans, little is known about the state of Cramond for several centuries. The historiography of the period has been summed up by the historian J. Wood, who wrote 'a dark cloud of obscurity again settled over the parish of Cramond, of which I cannot find the smallest memorial in any historian till the year 995.'

A tower house, Cramond Tower, probably built in the early 15th century, and part of a now-demolished larger establishment, was once a manor house of the Bishops of Dunkeld, of whose diocese Cramond was a part. It was made structurally sound and converted to a private dwelling in the 1980s.

=== Modern history ===
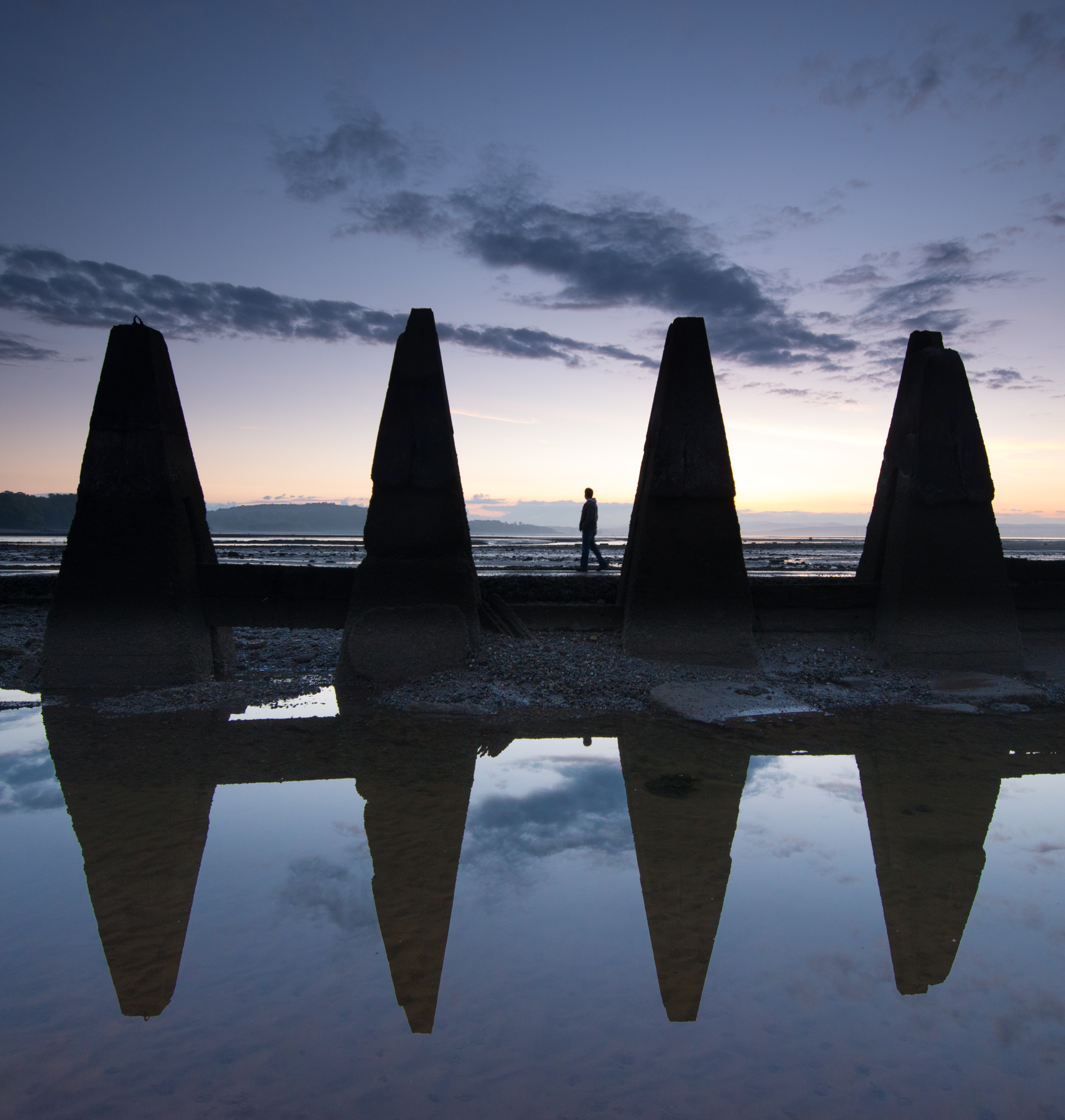
Cramond causeway pylons in Edinburgh in the evening light with a walker strolling along the causeway.

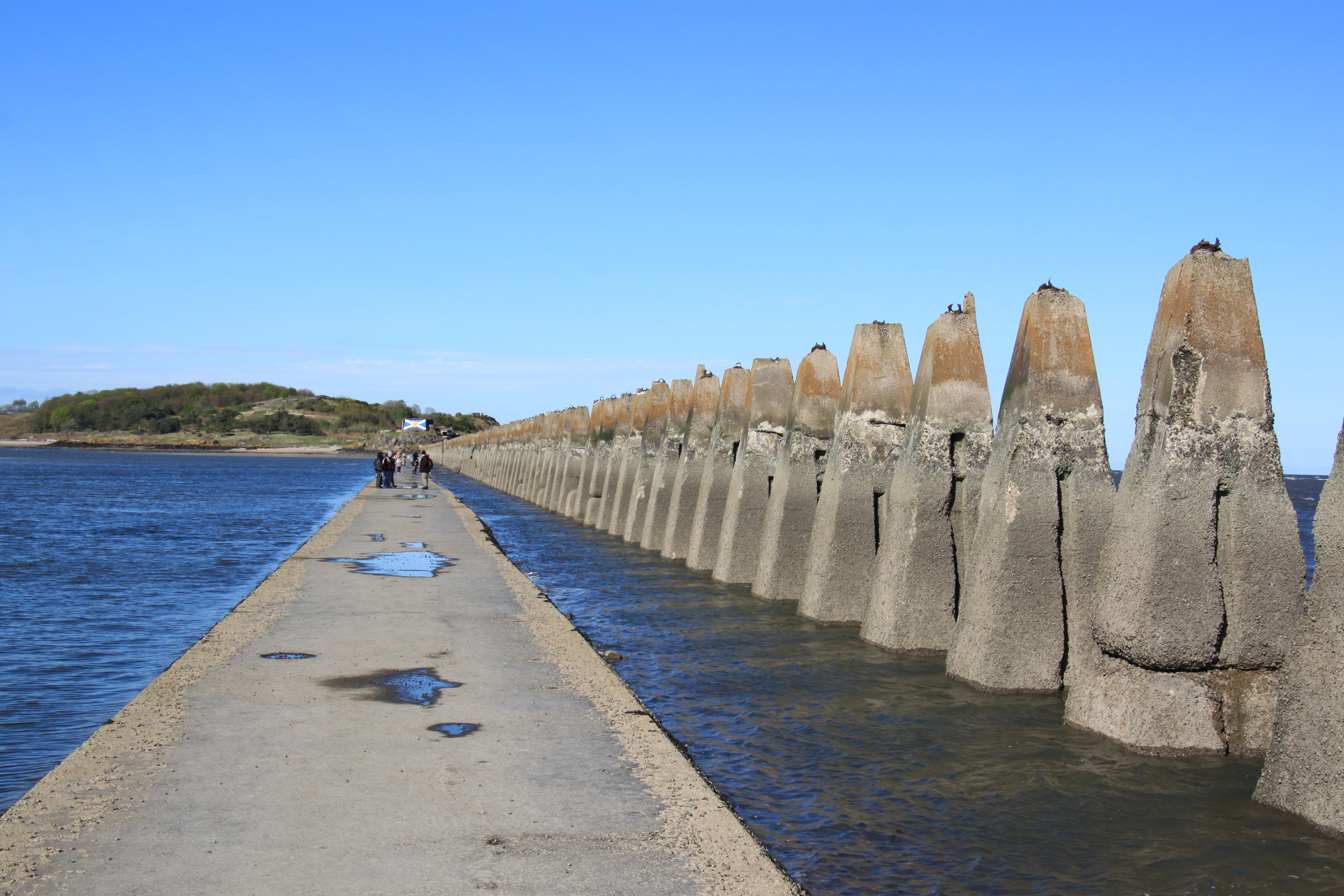
View of Cramond Causeway looking towards Cramond Island

Cramond developed slowly over the centuries, with Cramond Kirk being founded in 1656. After a brief period spent as an industrial village in the late 18th and early 19th centuries, by the late 19th century it became a desirable suburb of Edinburgh, which it remains to this day.

Cramond was officially made part of Edinburgh on 1 November 1920.

On 21 February 2009, Philippa Langley began her successful Looking For Richard Project at the Cramond Inn.

== Geography ==
Cramond is located in northwest Edinburgh, about 5 miles (8.0 km) from the city centre, at the mouth of the River Almond where it enters the Firth of Forth.

Historically, the parish of Cramond extended from the shore of the Firth of Forth in the north to the parish of Corstorphine in the south, and was bounded on the west by the parishes of Dalmeny and Kirkliston and on the east by the parish of St Cuthbert's. It covered an area of fifteen square miles, and encompassed the villages of Granton, Pilton, Muirhouse, Davidson's Mains, Blackhall, Ravelston, Craigcrook, Turnhouse and Craigiehall.

The area has a low, gently undulating topography that drops down from the top of Corstorphine hill to the shore in three gradual stages and is intersected by the River Almond which flows northward into the Forth. John Philip Wood writing in 1794 calls the river "Amon" and notes the stretch running from Craigiehall to the Firth of Forth has wooded, high and steep banks, "frequently chequered with bold and overhanging rocks". During the last ice age the area was heavily glaciated, and the main direction of the ice flow was west to east. Consequently, there are rock deposits on the east side of landforms such as the Almond river valley, and until the Cramond promenade was built in the 1930s large glacial boulders were strewn along the shore.

The geology of Cramond consists of calciferous sandstone, which mixed with two later sills to give the area its characteristic chocolate-brown soil. The leaflet "Geological history of cramond" provides information about the geology of the cramond area such as that there is a coal seam visible near the beach on the south west side of the river almond estuary.

On the coast, west of the River Almond is Hunter's Craig or Eagle Rock, with a carving traditionally maintained to be that of an eagle. The carving was described by William Maitland in 1753 to have become "prey to time and the inclemency of the weather". A Historic Environment Scotland record compiled in 2016 states the age of the carving as uncertain and its present condition as extremely weathered.

== Landmarks and sculpture ==
The 8 tonne work Fish has been permanently installed on the Waterfront at Cramond in 2009 after a successful campaign by the Cramond community, paying homage to the eight months of carving of the pink granite there by sculptor Ronald Rae in 2002.

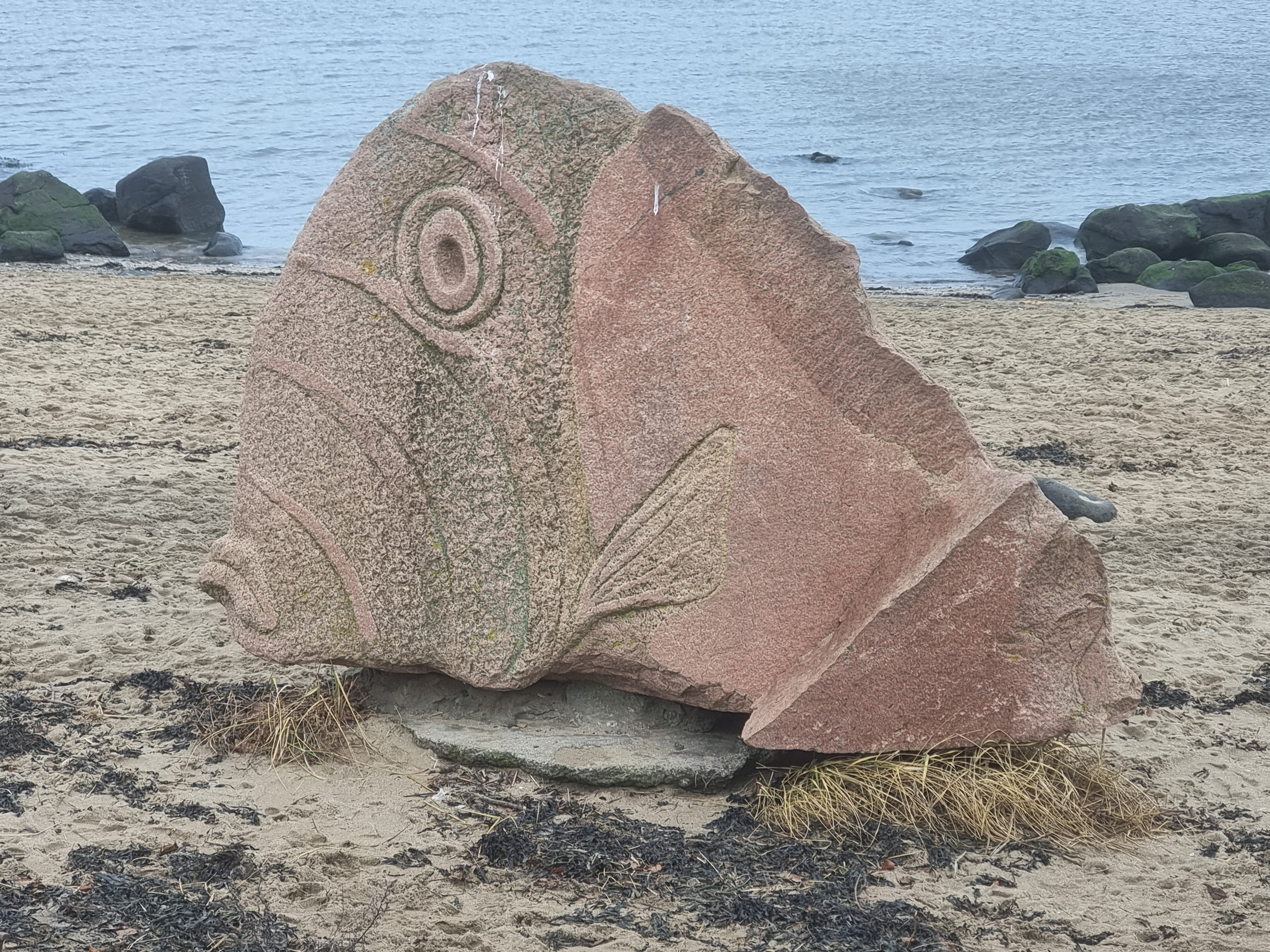
The Fish sculpture by Ronald Rae.

Cramond Kirk Church Hall also displays the smaller Cramond Fish. In the car park, to the rear of the Kirk Hall, another sculpture (elephant) is taking shape.

== Architecture ==
The older houses along the wharf are typical of traditional south-east Scottish vernacular architecture, constructed in stone with harling white lime render finish, with facing stone window and door surrounds and crow-step gables, roofed with orangey-red clay pantiles imported from the Netherlands. A ruined water mill lies further up the Almond along a quiet walk past a yacht club and sailing boats moored in the river. To the east a sand beach and waterfront esplanade provides a popular walk to Silverknowes and Granton. On the other side of the Almond, (once accessible by a rowing-boat ferry) the Dalmeny Estate has a pleasant walk through Dalmeny Woods along the shore of the Firth of Forth.

A rare example of a morthouse is located in the Church of Scotland churchyard.

Near the kirk stands the imposing Cramond House. Its central part is late 17th century, with classical front added in 1778 and back in 1820. Queen Victoria visited while residing at Holyrood. It has been claimed as a possible original of R. L. Stevenson’s "House of Shaws" in Kidnapped. It is now owned by Trustees of the Church of Scotland and until 2010 was used as the headquarters of the Scottish Wildlife Trust. The Trust relocated to Leith. The Manse dates originally from the mid-17th century and was rebuilt in the mid-18th century. The north wing was added about 1770 and a south wing in 1857. Reverend Walker, the skating minister in Raeburn's famous portrait, lived here from 1776 to 1784.

Offshore, Cramond Island has WW II fortifications and is linked to land by a causeway with a line of concrete pylons on one side, constructed as an anti shipping barrier. At certain low tides, sand extends to the island, tempting visitors to visit the island, though occasionally some are stranded by the incoming tide.

== In fiction ==
Cramond is associated with The Prime of Miss Jean Brodie, where Mr. Lowther has his home and Miss Brodie spends much of her time. Cramond is also where the House of Shaws is located in Robert Louis Stevenson's Kidnapped. Cramond is also mentioned in Ian Rankin's Fleshmarket Close.

Cramond features briefly in a series 2 episode of the Paul Temple (TV series) called 'Double Vision' filmed in 1970. More recently Cramond featured in Young Sherlock Holmes: Fire Storm.

- Gary Mill's historical fiction novel 'Cramond' is set in Cramond during the Roman occupation circa AD 150

== Notable residents ==
- Russell Barr, Minister and Former Moderator of The Church of Scotland.
- Campbell Maclean, Minister
- David Bruce (minister)
- John Chesser (architect), buried in Cramond Kirkyard
- Sir William Edmonstone
- Sir John Inglis, 2nd Baronet
- Rev George Muirhead (1764–1847) minister of Cramond 1816 to 1847
- James Stuart (1775–1849), politician.
- Rev. Leonard Small, Moderator of the General Assembly.
- Robert Walker (clergyman), model of the Skating Minister, was at Cramond Kirk.
- John Philip Wood
- John Law (economist), Scottish Economist
- J. K. Rowling
