= Inglis (surname) =

Inglis is a surname, derived from Early Modern and Middle English forms of the word English. Notable people with the surname include:

- Agnes Inglis (1870–1952), American anarchist
- Alexander Inglis (died 1496), Scottish cleric and royal clerk
- Alfred Inglis (1856–1919), Kent county cricketer
- Amirah Inglis (1926–2015), Australian communist and writer
- Anthony Inglis (conductor) (born 1952), English conductor
- Anthony Inglis (shipbuilder) (1813–1884), an engineer and shipbuilder.
- Bob Inglis (born 1959), US congressman from South Carolina
- Brian Inglis (1916–1993), Irish/English journalist
- Charles Inglis (c. 1731–1791), Royal Navy officer
- Charles Inglis, Royal Navy officer
- Charles Inglis (1734–1816), the first Church of England bishop of the Diocese of Nova Scotia
- Charles Inglis (1875–1952), British civil engineer and academic
- Charles M. Inglis (1870–1954), Indian scientist
- Colin James Inglis (1928–2005), English Chief Scout
- Dorothy Inglis (1926–2013), Canadian women's rights activist
- Esther Inglis (1571–1624), Scottish miniaturist, embroiderer, calligrapher, translator and writer
- Elsie Inglis (1864–1917), Scottish physician
- Frank Inglis (1899–1969), Head of RAF Intelligence in WW2
- Fred Inglis (born 1937), English academic
- Greg Inglis (born 1987), Australian Rugby League player
- James Inglis (physician) (1813–1851), Scottish physician, author and geologist
- James Inglis (c. 1922–1951), Scottish murderer
- James Charles Inglis (1851–1911), British civil engineer
- John Inglis, Lord Glencorse (1810–1891), Scottish politician and judge
- John Inglis (bishop) (1777–1850), Canadian bishop
- John Inglis (shipbuilder) (1842–1919), Scottish shipbuilder
- John K. Inglis (1933–2011), English biologist and writer
- John Eardley Wilmot Inglis (1814–1862), Scottish soldier
- John Frederic Inglis (1853–1923), British cricketer, footballer and soldier
- John Inglis and William Inglis, Canadian businessmen and head of John Inglis and Company
- John C. Inglis (born 1954), American security official
- Vice-Admiral Sir John Gilchrist Inglis (1906–1972), British naval officer and head of Naval Intelligence
- Josh Inglis (born 1995), Australian cricketer
- Judy Inglis (1952–2003), British artist
- Julia, Lady Inglis, née Thesiger (1833–1904), who wrote a diary on the Siege of Lucknow
- Ken Inglis (1929–2017), Australian historian
- Maddison Inglis (born 1998), Australian tennis player
- Mark Inglis (born 1959), New Zealand mountaineer
- Neil Inglis (born 1974), Scottish footballer
- Rob Inglis (1933–c. 2021), Australian actor, writer, and audiobook narrator
- Robert Inglis (merchant), 17th-century London-based merchant
- Robert Harry Inglis (1786–1855), English Conservative politician
- Rupert Inglis (1863–1916), English international rugby player
- Sergt. Inglis, Scottish soldier who played once for Southampton Football Club in 1896
- Sheila Legge (née Chetwynd Inglis; c. 1911 – 5 January 1949)
- Simon Inglis (born 1955), English journalist
- Stephanie Inglis (born 1988), Scottish judoka
- Tony Inglis (1911–1997), Irish/English art director
- William Inglis (disambiguation)

== See also ==
- Template:Inglis family
- Ingles (surname)
- English (surname)
