= Alfred Inglis =

English cricketer & banker (1856–1919)

Alfred Markham Inglis
- Born: 24 September 1856; Casouli, India
- Died: 17 June 1919 (aged 62); Westerham, Kent, England
- Education: Rugby School
- Alma mater: Brasenose College, Oxford
- Occupation: Banker
- Spouse: Ernestine (Nina) May Pigou (m. 1892)
- Parents: Lt-Col John Eardley Inglis (father); Hon. Julia Selina Thesiger (mother)
- Relatives: Frank Inglis (son); John Frederic Inglis (brother); Rupert Inglis (brother); Frederic Thesiger (grandfather); Hubert Ashton (nephew); Gilbert Ashton (nephew); Percy Ashton (nephew); Claude Ashton (nephew); John Gilchrist Inglis (nephew); Alfred Thesiger (uncle)

Alfred Markham Inglis (24 September 1856 – 17 June 1919) was an amateur cricketer who played for MCC and Kent County Cricket Club in the 1870s. By profession, he was a banker.

== Early life ==
Inglis was born in Casouli, India where his father, Lieutenant-Colonel John Eardley Inglis was serving in the 32nd (Cornwall) Regiment of Foot. His mother was the Hon. Julia Selina Thesiger, daughter of Frederic Thesiger, 1st Baron Chelmsford. By June 1857, when Inglis was less than a year old, his father was second-in-command under Sir Henry Lawrence at Lucknow where the British residency was under siege by Indian "rebels". Lawrence was killed during the early days of the siege, and as a result Col. Inglis took command of the British forces. Mrs. Inglis kept a diary of the events during the siege which lasted until November when the British were evacuated following the relief of the town by General Colin Campbell. Her diary was published in 1892.

In the diary she often talks about keeping the "boys" and the "baby" (Alfred) safe during the siege and retreat:

I talked to him (Dr. Scott) for some time, and consulted him about baby, who was looking thin and weak. (15 July)
This evening I was standing outside the door with baby in my arms, talking to the ayah, when I felt something whiz past my ears. (23 July)
A poor woman . . . whose husband . . . had been killed during the siege, came to-day to ask me to give her a little milk for her only child, who was dying for the want of proper nourishment. It went to my heart to refuse her; but at this time I had only just enough for my own children, and baby could not have lived without it. I think she understood that I would have given her some if I could. (14 August)
The children still kept pretty well, though baby grew thinner every day; nothing I gave him seemed to nourish him. (28 August)
As we were starting, Major Ouvry brought us some beer to drink, and poor baby, who was very thirsty, cried louder for it than I had ever heard him before. With difficulty I pacified him, and succeeded in getting him to sleep. Just then the word 'Halt!' was heard, and silence was ordered, all lights to be put out. It was evident some danger was apprehended, and I shall never forget my anxiety lest baby should commence crying again, and perhaps betray our whereabouts; I hardly dared breathe. (19 November)

Following the retreat from Lucknow, Mrs. Inglis and her three children returned to England on board SS Ava; the ship set out from Calcutta for Suez on 10 February 1858, but ran aground off Pigeon Island, about 12 miles from Trincomalee, Ceylon on 16 February. The passengers and crew were rescued after spending a night in the ship's boats; the family eventually reached Alexandria before travelling on to Southampton, arriving there in early March.

Inglis was educated at Rugby School before going up to Brasenose College, Oxford in 1876. He became a banker.

== Cricket career ==
At Rugby School, Inglis was a member of the cricket XI in 1875 with appearances against Marlborough College and MCC. His first-class cricket debut came ten years later when he played for MCC against Lancashire. He scored 11 and 12 respectively in his two innings as MCC were defeated by 8 wickets. Inglis' only appearance in County cricket came in June 1887 for Kent County Cricket Club against Lancashire.

Inglis was a keen club cricketer and played for Esher, Free Foresters, Private Banks and Incogniti, continuing into his 40s. For Free Foresters he had a reputation as a fielder, as recounted by W. K. Riland in his "Annals of the Free Foresters from 1856 to the present day"

Alfred Inglis kindly did all the fielding for our side. Time may have tempered to some degree that ready enthusiasm; but a few years ago, when Inglis was playing on my side, I found it expedient to yell out " Inglis " whenever a ball was hit at all high in the air, by way of saving from utter destruction any other rash or unwary fieldsman who might feel inclined or possibly entitled to go for the catch.

He was the most zealous and untiring fieldsman I ever saw, the sort of man who, if standing or fretting at deep square-leg, might be relied upon to back up cover-point on an emergency. Who that has experienced it will ever forget the sound, as of a mighty rushing steam-engine behind him, as he went to fetch a fourer when Inglis was on the war-path! His activity in very sooth covered not only much ground, but a multitude of other people's sins.

== Business career ==
Inglis was a partner in Child & Co., bankers of Fleet Street, London.

Inglis lived at "Lynton", Beckenham, and died at Westerham, Kent on 17 June 1919.

== Family ==
On 21 April 1892, Inglis married Ernestine (Nina) May Pigou (1863–1941), daughter of Francis Pigou, the Dean of Bristol. They had five children:

- John (Jack) Alfred Pigou Inglis (1893–1915), killed at the Battle of Loos.
- Ernestine (Nesta) Mary Inglis (1895–1990), headmistress at Tudor Hall School, Chislehurst, Kent and later at Wykham Park, Banbury, Oxfordshire.
- Mildred Catherine Jane Inglis (1897–1979), married (Sir) Victor Goddard (1897–1987) who was a senior commander in the Royal Air Force during World War II.
- Francis Frederic Inglis (1899–1969), became Air Vice-Marshal and Head of RAF Intelligence Staff during World War II.
- Alfred Walter Inglis (1899–1967), became Assistant Chief Labour Officer for Imperial Chemical Industries.

Inglis was the third surviving child of John and Julia Inglis. His siblings were:

- John Frederic Inglis (b. 1852, died an infant)
- John Frederic Inglis (1853–1923), who played cricket for Kent and football for Wanderers and Scotland
- Charles George Inglis (1855–1923), who became a tea planter on the Agra Kandy Estate in Ceylon.
- Victoria Alexandrina Inglis (1859–1929), who married Hubert Ashton, and was mother of cricketers Hubert, Gilbert, Percy and Claude
- Julia Mathilda Inglis (1861–1929), who married Sir George Herman Collier of the India Office
- Rupert Edward Inglis (1863–1916), who was an England international rugby player and became a minister in the Church of England before serving as a chaplain in the First World War and was killed during the Battle of the Somme.
