= Alfred Thesiger =

British judge and lawyer (1838-1880)

The Right Honourable Alfred Henry Thesiger
- Born: 15 July 1838
- Died: 20 October 1880 (aged 42)
- Resting place: Brompton Cemetery, London
- Occupations: Lawyer and judge
- Spouse: Henrietta Handcock (m. 1862)
- Parents: Frederic Thesiger (father); Anna Maria Tinling (mother)
- Relatives: Julia Thesiger (sister); Bertram Thesiger (nephew); Ernest Thesiger (nephew); Alfred Inglis (nephew); John Frederic Inglis (nephew); Rupert Inglis (nephew)

Alfred Henry Thesiger (15 July 1838 – 20 October 1880), was a British lawyer and judge.

== Early life ==
Thesiger was the third son of Lord Chancellor Frederic Thesiger, 1st Baron Chelmsford, by his wife Anna Maria (née Tinling). He played one first-class cricket match for the Marylebone Cricket Club in 1861.

== Career ==
He was Attorney-General to the Prince of Wales and was appointed a Queen's Counsel in 1873. In 1877, at the age of 37, he was made a Lord Justice of Appeal and sworn of the Privy Council.

In the summer of 1877 Thesiger, took on the Arbitration of Doctor Thomas Barnardo as his legal counsel at the behest of the Evangelical Lord Chancellor, Lord Cairns. (p. 105 "Slumming" Seth Koven)

=== Judgments ===
- The Household Fire and Carriage Accident Insurance Company (Limited) v Grant (1878–79) LR 4 Ex D 216 – English contract law concerning the "postal rule", and containing an important dissenting judgment by Bramwell LJ, who wished to dispose of it.
- Wheeldon v Burrows 1879) LR 12 Ch D 31; [1874-90] All ER Rep. 669; (1879) 48 LJ Ch 853; (1879) 41 LT 327 – English land law case on the implying of grant easements. The case established one of the three current methods by which an easement can be acquired by implied grant
- Sturges v Bridgman (1879) LR 11 Ch D 852 – reasonable use of property depends on the character of the locality and arguing that the plaintiff "came to the nuisance" is not a defence.

== Family ==
His sister, Julia was married to Sir John Eardley Wilmot Inglis, who commanded the British forces during the Siege of Lucknow in 1857. She later wrote of her experiences during the siege including extracts from her diary.

Thesiger married Henrietta, daughter of the Hon. George Handcock, in 1862. They had no children. He died in October 1880, aged 42. He is buried in Brompton Cemetery, London. Henrietta Thesiger died in February 1921.
