= Rupert Inglis =

England international rugby union player (1863-1916)

Rupert Edward Inglis
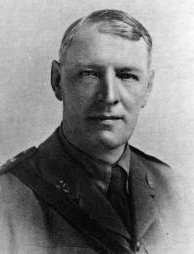
- Rupert Edward Inglis pictured as an army chaplain in the First World War
- Born: 17 May 1863 Hanover Square, London
- Died: 18 September 1916 (aged 53)
- School: Rugby School
- University: University College, Oxford
- Notable relative(s): Sir John Eardley Wilmot Inglis (father); Julia Selina Thesiger (mother); Frederic Thesiger (grandfather); John Frederic Inglis (brother); Alfred Markham Inglis (brother); John Gilchrist Inglis (son); General Frederic Thesiger, 2nd Baron Chelmsford (uncle)

Rugby union career
Amateur team(s)
Years	Team	Apps	(Points)
1883-1884	Oxford University RFC		
1885-18??	Blackheath		
International career
Years	Team	Apps	(Points)
1886	England	3	
- Military career
- Allegiance: United Kingdom
- Branch: British Army
- Service years: 1915-1916
- Rank: Chaplain
- Units: Royal Army Chaplains' Department; King's Shropshire Light Infantry; 6th Division
- Conflicts: World War I; Battle of the Somme †

Rupert Edward Inglis (17 May 1863 – 18 September 1916) was an England international rugby player who later became a Church of England rector. During the First World War, Inglis was a chaplain to the British Army and was killed during the Battle of the Somme.

== Early life and education ==
Inglis was born in the Hanover Square area of London. He was the youngest son of Nova Scotian Sir John Eardley Wilmot Inglis (who died 8 months before Rupert was born) and Julia Selina Thesiger; his father commanded the British forces during the Siege of Lucknow in 1857. His mother, who was the daughter of Frederic Thesiger, the first Baron Chelmsford, Lord Chancellor, later wrote of her experiences during the siege including extracts from her diary.

He was educated at Rugby School from 1877 before going up to University College, Oxford in 1881 to read history. On leaving Oxford in 1885, he attended Ely Theological College and was ordained deacon in 1889.

== Family ==
Inglis was the youngest of seven children. His siblings were:

- John Frederic Inglis (b. 1852, died an infant)
- John Frederic Inglis (1853–1923), who played cricket for Kent and football for Wanderers and Scotland
- Charles George Inglis (1855–1923), who became a tea planter on the Agra Kandy Estate in Ceylon.
- Alfred Markham Inglis (1856–1919), who played cricket for Kent
- Victoria Alexandrina Inglis (1859–1929), married Hubert Ashton, mother of cricketers Hubert, Gilbert, Percy and Claude
- Julia Mathilda Inglis (1861–1929), married to Sir George Herman Collier of the India Office

On 11 June 1900, he married Helen Mary Gilchrist. They had three children:

- Joan Clara Thesiger Inglis (1901–1967)
- John Gilchrist Thesiger Inglis (1906–1972) who was knighted and rose to the rank of Vice-Admiral.
- Margaret Cochran Inglis (1911–1994)

== Sporting career ==
At Rugby School, Inglis was a member of the school cricket and rugby teams. He played cricket for M.C.C. against the school in June 1879, aged 16. He also played against Marlborough College in July 1881 when he was the top-scorer in the first innings, helping Rugby win the match by two wickets.

He was a member of the school rugby XV in 1879 and 1880 and also of the rugby XVs at Oxford University in 1883 and 1884, winning his Blue. Inglis became a member of the Blackheath rugby club and made three appearances for the England national rugby union team. His debut came against Wales at Rectory Field, Blackheath on 2 January 1886 in a match which England won on tries scored. This was followed by a victory over Ireland in February and a draw with Scotland in March. As a result, England shared the 1886 Home Nations Championship with Scotland.

== Clerical career ==
Inglis was ordained deacon in 1889 by the Bishop of Beverley. He became curate at Helmsley from 1889 to 1890 and then at Basingstoke from 1892 to 1899 (being ordained priest by the Bishop of Winchester in 1894), before being appointed Rector of Frittenden, Kent in 1900.

On 13 April 1905, he read the committal part of the service during the funeral of his uncle, General Frederic Thesiger, Lord Chelmsford.

== First World War ==
In 1915, Inglis decided that, if he was to encourage the young men of his village to sign up for the army, he would also have to volunteer. At the age of 51, therefore, he was commissioned as a Chaplain to the Forces, 4th Class on 5 July 1915; he was attached to 1st Battalion, King's Shropshire Light Infantry, arriving in France later in July 1915. For a short while he did duty at No. 23 General Hospital, Étaples, and then joined No. 21 Casualty Clearing Station at Corbie, near Albert. In December 1915, he was attached to the 16th Infantry Brigade, 6th Division, in the Ypres Salient.

Throughout his time at the front, he wrote home regularly either to his parishioners or to his wife. After the war, his widow edited the letters and privately published a volume as a record for their children and others. His explanatory letter to his parishioners opens the volume:

France July 7

Dear Parishioners,

I think most of you will understand how I come to be writing from France. I have felt that in this great crisis of our nation's history, everyone ought to do what he can to help. I have said this both publicly and privately, but it has been hard to tell people that they ought to leave their homes, to go out into strange and new surroundings, to endure discomforts and danger—perhaps to face death—it has been hard to tell people that this was their duty and then to remain comfortably at home myself. So that is why I have left you for an indefinite period.

I am proud, very proud of what Frittenden has done. I know how hard it has been for many of the soldiers to leave their homes and their families and occupations; but the harder it has been, the greater the credit and the greater the reward.

I need not tell you that Frittenden will be constantly in my thoughts and that it will make things easier for me here if I hear that everything is going on well in the Parish.

I ask for your prayers. I ask you to pray that I may be a help to those to whom I have to minister out here. That God will bless and keep you all, is the prayer of

Your Affectionate Rector,

(Signed) Rupert E. Inglis.

At first, his letters home are optimistic and bright but the tone changes as he spends more time close to the front. He arrived at Étaples on 5 July and spent his time there acting as a censor of soldier's letters home as well as giving spiritual guidance to the wounded and conducting Sunday worship. He also helped the soldiers write letters home to their wives and families.

On 20 September 1915, he was transferred to the casualty clearing station at Corbie, located in a former bicycle factory. As well as his spiritual work, he helped feed and dress the wounded patients. His first period of leave since enlisting came in November, when he spent a week home, before returning to the front. On his return passage, he was shipped from Southampton on a crowded troop ship.

When we got on board there wasn’t a seat to be had, and not much lying down room on the floor. I got on to a pile of luggage, in the middle of the night I stretched out my legs and kicked what I thought was a pile of luggage, but it happened to be a man, he expostulated rather vigorously, I am not surprised.

Within a few weeks of returning to the front, he was again on the move; he was attached to the 16th Infantry Brigade, 6th Division, consisting of the 1st King's Shropshire Light Infantry, the 1st Buffs, the 2nd York and Lancasters and the 8th Bedfords. By 18 December, he was camped in a wood near Vlamertinghe where he met a fellow chaplain, Neville Talbot, son of the Bishop of Winchester, who had helped found the Toc H movement, and nursed him through a bout of flu.

By Christmas, Talbot had returned home on leave and Inglis was senior chaplain. On Christmas Day, he had church services in the morning and then was entertained with a band concert in the evening. There was no truce: "The firing was not heavy but there was some going on all day. . ."

By this time, his letters home regularly complained about the conditions, both in the field hospital ("You would love to see this hut – the untidiness of it beats anything I have ever seen", "It's awfully difficult to get coal here – our allowance is 1 ½ lbs. per head per day. It isn’t much, to keep this and the kitchen fire going") and in the battlefield generally ("[the] mud . . . beggars description, and is getting worse", "the trenches are in an awful state; it is of course, quite impossible to drain them, as everything is flat").

He was able to return home on leave at the end of January 1916, but was soon "back in my little wooden hut'" again. He continued to spend his time ministering to the needs of the injured soldiers and helping them write letters home. He also assisted the surgeon in operations in the field hospital; in a letter to his daughter Joan in February he relates an anecdote about his work in the hospital:

Our best surgeon is a very nice Irishman and he always takes the worst cases and I sort of work with him. The men have generally had morphia given to them, but they do not often give an anaesthetic in a Field Ambulance, so it is very often very painful for the poor chaps having their wounds dressed and attended to. A man often suffers a lot anticipating he is going to be hurt, and by talking to him and interesting him you can often take his mind off – about all sorts of things, cricket, football, boxing – Captain Moore always helps along and joins in. The other day we had a Welshman who had some very painful wounds. As a rule Welshmen do not stand pain very well, but this man was very keen on football, so he and I and Moore carried on a violent discussion about football and the man got through it splendidly, and I went off to another man. Then Moore found he had something more to do to the Welshman, so he came over and said "Come along – my local anaesthetic – I want you to talk some more football."

After a brief spell at Calais in March, Inglis returned to the Ypres Salient where the brigade came under heavy bombardment, resulting in many casualties including the death of the Colonel, Edward Bourryau Luard (1870–1916) (son of General Richard Luard). Over the next few months, he was regularly on the move with the brigade, spending much of his time, when not involved with funerals and other church services, organising a shop to supply the soldiers and later acting as "Mess President", organising the canteen.

By mid September, he was at Ginchy; two days after the Battle of Ginchy, when the village was re-taken from the enemy, he describes walking across the battlefield: "Then I walked across country with them – a wonderful country, all shell holes and trenches – trenches which till recently were German." His final letter home was dated 17 September 1916 in which he describes his work with the stretcher bearers, bringing the wounded soldiers to the dressing station. His letter closes:

I didn’t get back till 6.30 this morning. I had a good three hours sleep. In a few minutes will be off to the Dressing Station. I shall probably be back early to-day.

The following day, 18 September, he joined a party of stretcher-bearers, in order to help bring in the wounded. While doing this, he was struck by a fragment of shell and while his wound was being dressed a second shell killed him instantly. In his letter of condolence to Mrs. Inglis, Rev. Neville Talbot praised Inglis' bravery and gallantry:

I cannot overstate the sorrow there is to-day in his Brigade. They simply loved him.

He was buried close to the battlefield at Ginchy; his body was not recovered after the end of the war.

== Tributes ==
Apart from the letter from Neville Talbot, several other fellow officers sent tributes to Mrs. Inglis:

He was one of those whom it was only necessary to meet and then to love.

None knew his worth more than we did, as he had lived with us for so long. One of the bravest men I had ever met and we see many here, he gave his life to help others.

He was a man in a million, and very many of us in the 16th Brigade, owe him more than we can say.

Your brave husband did untold good work in removing the wounded out of danger while fighting was in progress. He was so well known to all the men that his presence with the wounded was of great help to them.

He was quite fearless, and always glad to rough it in a way that put to shame some younger men.

He died nobly, doing his duty and setting a striking example to others.

== Memorials ==
Inglis' name is among the 72,000 dead with no known grave commemorated on the Thiepval Memorial. There is also a memorial to him at All Saints' Church, Basingstoke where he had served as a curate.

At Frittenden, he is commemorated on the War Memorial while the lychgate at St. Mary's church is dedicated to him; there is also a tablet to his memory in the chancel of the church. On Remembrance Sunday 2009, Inglis' nephew, Hubert Ashton, preached at St. Mary's church, Frittenden. Parishioners also visited Ginchy where a memorial service was held in honour of the First World War dead. A memorial to the students of the Ely Theological College is now at King's Ely.
