= John Frederic Inglis =

Scottish sportsperson (1853–1923)

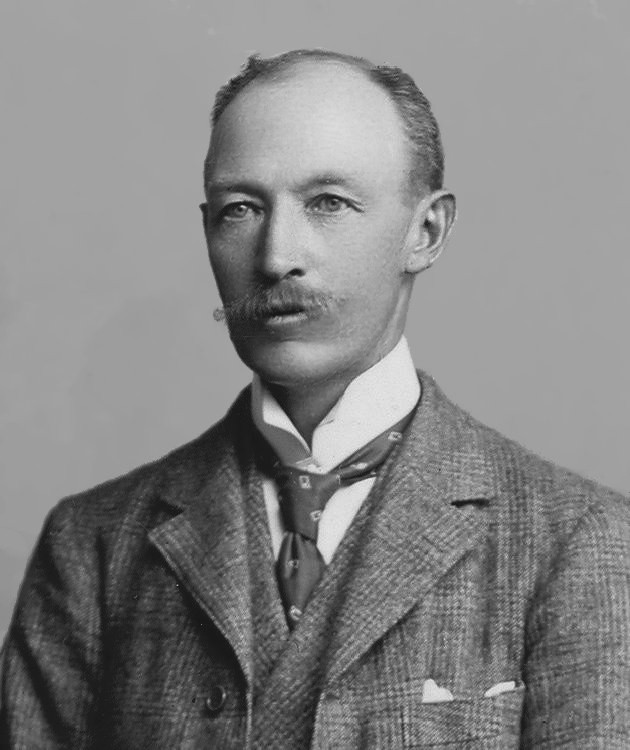
- John Frederic Inglis
- Born: 16 July 1853; Peshawar, India
- Died: 27 February 1923 (aged 69); Littleham, Devon, England
- Education: Charterhouse School
- Spouse: Janet Alice Thornhill
- Parents: Lt Col John Eardley Inglis (father); Julia Selina Thesiger (mother)
- Relatives: Frederic Thesiger (maternal grandfather); Alfred Markham Inglis (brother); Rupert Edward Inglis (brother); Hubert Ashton (nephew); Gilbert Ashton (nephew); Percy Ashton (nephew); Claude Ashton (nephew)
Association football career
Senior career*
Years	Team	Apps	(Gls)
187?	Wanderers		
International career
1871	Scotland	1	(0)
Military career
Allegiance	United Kingdom
Branch	British Army
Service years	1873-1890
Rank	Major
Units	62nd (Wiltshire) Regiment of Foot; The Duke of Edinburgh's (Wiltshire Regiment)
- * Club domestic league appearances and goals

John Frederic Inglis (16 July 1853 – 27 February 1923) was a Scottish amateur sportsman who became a major in the Duke of Edinburgh's (Wiltshire Regiment). He played cricket for Kent County Cricket Club and football for the Wanderers and for Scotland in a representative match in 1871.

== Family ==
Inglis was born in Peshawar, India where his father, Lieutenant-Colonel John Eardley Inglis was serving in the 32nd (Cornwall) Regiment of Foot. His mother was Julia Selina Thesiger, daughter of Frederic Thesiger, 1st Baron Chelmsford.

He was the first surviving child of the marriage; his siblings were:

- John Frederic Inglis (b. 1852, died an infant)
- Charles George Inglis (1855–1923), who became a tea planter on the Agra Kandy Estate in Ceylon.
- Alfred Markham Inglis (1856–1919), who played cricket for Kent
- Victoria Alexandrina Inglis (1859–1929), who married Hubert Ashton, and was mother of cricketers Hubert, Gilbert, Percy and Claude
- Julia Mathilda Inglis (1861–1929), who married Sir George Herman Collier of the India Office
- Rupert Edward Inglis (1863–1916), who was an England international rugby player and became a minister in the Church of England before serving as a chaplain in the First World War and was killed during the Battle of the Somme.

Inglis was married to Janet Alice Thornhill, daughter of Rev. William Thornhill; they had no children.

== Early life ==
By June 1857, his father was second-in-command under Sir Henry Lawrence at Lucknow, where the British residency was under siege by Indian rebels. Lawrence was killed during the early days of the siege, and as a result Col. Inglis took command of the British forces. Mrs. Inglis kept a diary of the events during the siege, which lasted until November, when the British were evacuated following the relief of the town by General Colin Campbell. Her diary was published in 1892.

In the diary she often talks about keeping the "boys" and the "baby" (Alfred) safe during the siege and retreat:

This was Johnny's fourth birthday, a sad one to us all. We managed to get some toys for Johnny from a merchant inside. (16 July)
Johnny was not well to-day, and I feared he might be sickening for small-pox. (31 July)
Johnny's rosy cheeks, which he never lost, excited great admiration; he passed most of his time in the square next to us with the Sikhs, who were very fond of him, and used to give him chappatties (native bread), though they could not have had much to eat themselves, poor men! (28 August)
Mrs. Case and Johnny were walking in the square next to ours to-day, when a Sikh officer passed them, and directly afterwards he was hit in the arm by a bullet. No place was really safe, and I never liked having the children out of my sight. (18 October)
During the siege, we had picked up a little white hen, which used to run about and pick up what it could. Just before Colonel Campbell became so very ill, we had decided to kill and eat it, when one morning Johnny ran in and said, 'Oh, mamma, the white hen has laid an egg!' We took it at once to Colonel Campbell, it being a great luxury in those days. The hen laid one every day for him till he died, and then ceased for the rest of the siege; but we would not kill it then. (12 November)
I had at first put the two boys into a dhoolie with their ayah, but they got separated from us, and it was fully a quarter of an hour before I found them, so I would not let them go from me again . . . poor baby, who was very thirsty, cried louder for it [water] than I had ever heard him before. With difficulty I pacified him, and succeeded in getting him to sleep. (19 November)

Following the retreat from Lucknow, Mrs. Inglis and her three children returned to England on board the SS Ava; the ship set out from Calcutta for Suez on 10 February 1858, but ran aground off Pigeon Island, about 12 miles from Trincomalee, Ceylon on 16 February. The passengers and crew were rescued after spending a night in the ship's boats.

Johnny was delighted when [the waves] broke over the boat, and his merry laugh sounded sadly in my ears, for I quite thought that a watery grave awaited each one of us.

The family eventually reached Alexandria before travelling on to Southampton, arriving there in early March.

Inglis was educated at Charterhouse School, where he was enrolled in 1864.

== Sporting career ==
At Charterhouse, Inglis was a member of the school cricket XI between 1868 and 1871. His only first class cricket appearance came for Kent County Cricket Club against MCC at Lord's in May 1883 when he scored 19 runs as MCC were defeated by an innings and 78 runs.

In his final year at Charterhouse, Inglis was selected to represent Scotland at football in the third of a series of international matches; the match, played at the Kennington Oval on 25 February 1871, ended in a 1–1 draw. Inglis was later a member of the Wanderers club.

== Military career ==
On leaving school, Inglis enlisted in the 62nd (Wiltshire) Regiment of Foot being appointed a sub-lieutenant on 12 February 1873 and promoted to Lieutenant on the same day.

On 11 May 1878, he was appointed as an instructor of Musketry before being appointed as aide-de-camp to Major-General G. S. Young, Commanding the Troops in the Belfast District on 30 August 1883. By now, the regiment had been amalgamated into The Duke of Edinburgh's (Wiltshire Regiment).

He was subsequently promoted to captain on 31 December 1887, to Adjutant on 22 February 1888 and finally to Major on 19 March 1890.

Inglis died on 27 February 1923 at Littleham, Devon.
