= SS Ava (1855) =

History

United Kingdom
- Name: Ava
- Operator: Peninsular & Oriental Steam Navigation Company
- Port of registry: London
- Builder: Tod & McGregor, Glasgow
- Yard number: 76
- Launched: 3 May 1855
- Completed: 29 June 1855
- Fate: Wrecked on 16 February 1858 15 miles north of Trincomalee, Ceylon

General characteristics
- Type: Passenger Liner
- Tonnage: 1,613 GRT; 934 NRT
- Length: 267 ft 8 in (81.6 m)
- Beam: 35 ft 3 in (10.7 m)
- Propulsion: 1,056 ihp Two cylinder geared trunk steam engine
- Speed: 12 knots (22 km/h)
- Capacity: 97 First Class passengers, 30 Second Class
- Notes: All the above information, unless otherwise noted, was acquired from "Clydebuilt" database.

The SS Ava was a 1,613 GRT British steamship, constructed in 1855 by the Tod & McGregor shipyard in Glasgow. Described as "an iron screw barque with one funnel", she was operated by the Peninsular & Oriental Steam Navigation Company on the China mail service and was named after Ava, the ancient capital of Burma. She ran aground and was wrecked off the coast of Ceylon in February 1858.

== Sailing history ==
Delivered on 21 July 1855, she departed for her maiden voyage to Alexandria on 29 August. On this voyage, she broke a screw blade and was towed to Malta by the paddle packet HMS Medusa; the mail and passengers were forwarded on to Alexandria on board the Valetta.

In September 1856, she collided with the Teignmouth brig Blanche and lost a quarter boat. On 1 October 1856, she departed, via Tristan da Cunha and Galle, for Calcutta where she arrived on 16 December. On 3 September 1857, she left Calcutta carrying Lord Elgin on his mission to China. She returned to Calcutta on 7 December and was apparently unemployed until February 1858.

== Final voyage ==
On 10 February 1858, the Ava left Calcutta en route for Suez; her passengers included women and children refugees from the Indian rebellion, including Lady Julia Inglis, daughter of Frederic Thesiger, 1st Baron Chelmsford and the wife of Major-General Sir John Eardley Inglis, who commanded the British troops at the Siege of Lucknow, together with her three sons, John, Charles and Alfred. The cargo included 500 boxes containing £275,000 in gold.

After calling at Madras on 13 February, she departed for Suez; her captain, Captain Kirton, had been instructed to land at Trincomalee with about £5,000 of Government treasure. Mrs. Inglis had kept a diary of the events during the siege of Lucknow to which she added her account of the wreck:

We made good progress all that day (Tuesday). It was eight o'clock, a beautiful night, and we were running along at a great pace. Finding it very hot in the saloon after tea, [we] had come on deck, and were sitting on the bulwarks behind the wheel. Suddenly we were startled by a loud grating sound something like the letting down of an anchor, and just then saw a large rock close to us. I said, 'We must have touched that.' Several men rushed to the wheel, and then again we heard the same sound, only louder, and a quivering of the whole ship. She then remained stationary, only heaving backwards and forwards.

The passengers were put into the seven ship's boats:

The steamer had struck nearly in the centre; her fore part was sunk very deep, and we watched her with the greatest anxiety to see if the water gained on her, fearing for the safety of those still on board, and also dreading that if she sank our boats would all be swamped. We rowed backwards and forwards between the rocks and the steamer all night, and a weary time it was. Guns were fired, and rockets sent up; but our signals of distress were not answered, though a light we saw at some distance on the shore made us hopeful that assistance was at hand. The masts were cut down to lighten the ship, and the crash as they fell into the water sounded very fearful.

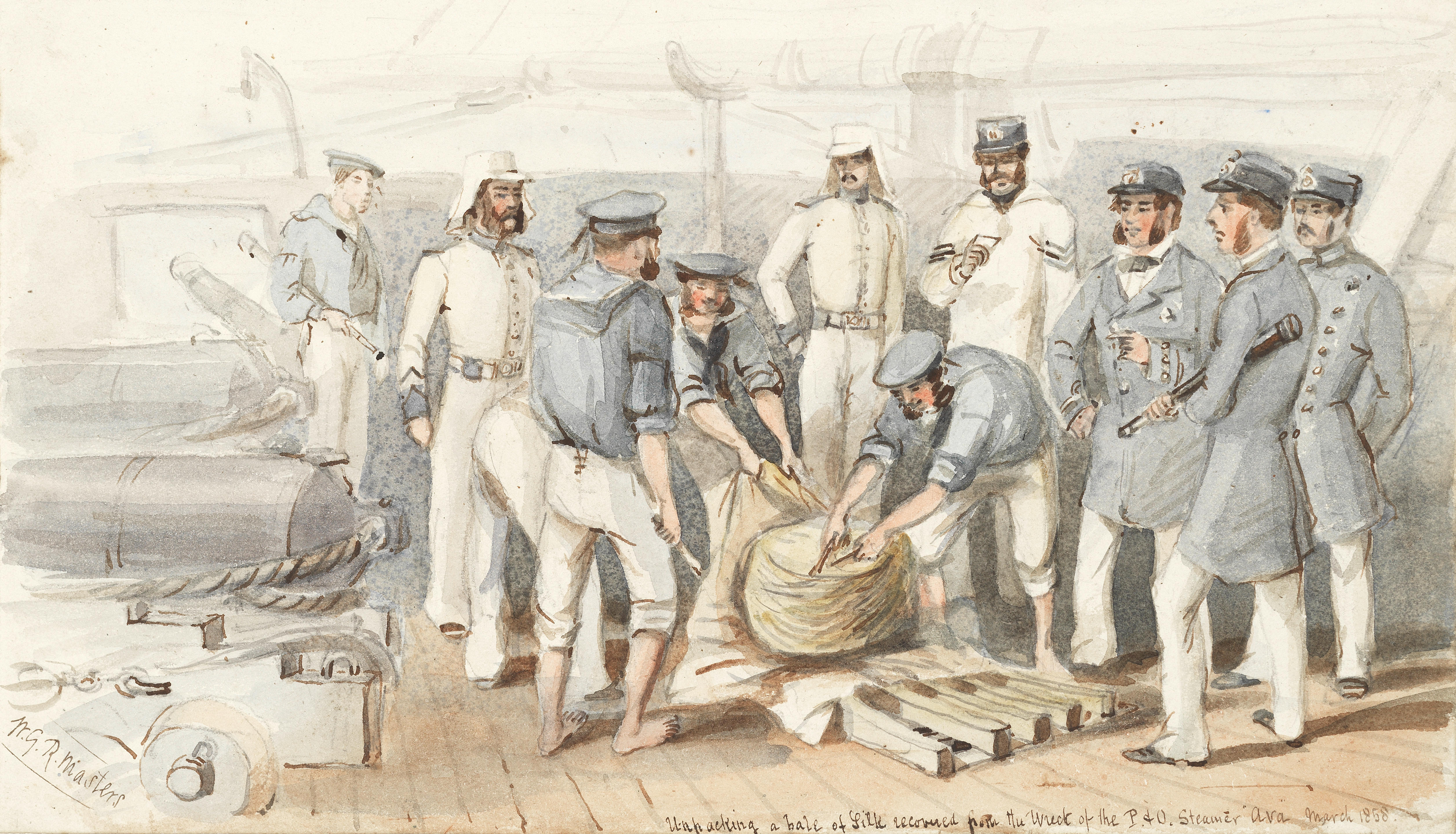
Unpacking a bale of silk recovered by HMS Chesapeake from the wreck, March 1858

The following morning, after spending the nights in the open boats, the passengers were rescued and taken to Trincomalee. All the passengers and crew were saved although most lost all their possessions. Mrs. Inglis managed to save her diary but her husband's personal journal was destroyed in the water. Most of the cargo of specie and a replacement shaft for the SS Alma, disabled at Aden, were recovered by divers from the frigate HMS Chesapeake.

The ship's surgeon was Dr. James Little, who also kept a diary recording his time with P & O. He recorded his experience during the shipwreck, describing spending a night in an open boat before landing on shore the next morning. He then spent some time in a tent on the beach while the crew attempted to recover what they could from the wreck. Dr. Little was later to become the chief physician at the Adelaide Hospital in Dublin and Regius Professor of Physic at Trinity College Dublin.

The ship had run aground on Pigeon Island, about 12 miles from Trincomalee. The subsequent Board of Trade enquiry found that

Captain Kirton omitted to take proper precautions; instead of continuing the ship's course at full speed for two hours after the dark, he ought to have slackened speed, to have stopped the ship and hove the head. Had he adopted these proper and prudent measures the calamity which followed would have been averted.

The Board of Trade in consequence directed that his certificate of competency was to be suspended for six months.
