= Frank Inglis =

Royal Air Force Air Vice-Marshal (1899–1969)

Francis Frederic Inglis
- Born: 22 June 1899; Beckenham, Kent, England
- Died: 25 September 1969 (aged 70); Sevenoaks, Kent, England
- Relatives: Alfred Inglis (father); Vice Admiral Sir John Inglis (cousin)
- Military career
- Allegiance: United Kingdom
- Branch: British Army (1918–1921); Royal Air Force (1921–1952)
- Service years: 1918–1952
- Rank: Air Vice Marshal
- Commands: No. 23 Group (1945–1947)
- Conflicts: First World War; Second World War
- Awards: Companion of the Order of the Bath; Commander of the Order of the British Empire; Commander of the Legion of Merit (United States); Grand Commander of the Order of the Phoenix (Greece)

Air Vice Marshal Francis Frederic Inglis, CB, CBE, DL (22 June 1899 – 25 September 1969) was an officer in the Royal Air Force who became the head of RAF Intelligence Staff during the Second World War, reporting to Winston Churchill. In 1942 he was sent to America, where he successfully persuaded President Franklin D. Roosevelt to direct the main American war effort against Germany rather than Japan.

== Family and early life ==
Inglis was the fourth child of Alfred Markham Inglis (1856–1919), a banker who had previously played cricket for Kent, and Ernestine (Nina) May Pigou (1863–1941). His grandparents were Major General Sir John Eardley Inglis and Lady Julia Inglis, who had survived the Siege of Lucknow, and Francis Pigou, the Dean of Bristol. His sister, Mildred Inglis (1897–1979), was married to Air Marshal Sir Victor Goddard (1897–1987) who was a senior commander in the Royal Air Force during the Second World War.

Inglis was educated at the Royal Military College, Sandhurst, and graduated in 1918, from where he was commissioned into the Duke of Cornwall's Light Infantry.

In the summer of 1927, he married Vera Helen "Midge" Turner (b. 1906). They had two daughters:

- Wendy Inglis (born 16 May 1928 - 2022), who married Wing Commander Peter William Helmore D.F.C., A.F.C. (son of Air Commodore William Helmore)
- Diana Gillian "Jill" Inglis (born 15 June 1931), who married Jeremy Howard-Williams D.F.C., a former night fighter pilot

His cousin, John Inglis was head of Naval Intelligence from 1954 to 1960.

== Royal Air Force career ==
After graduating from Sandhurst, Inglis spent three years with the Duke of Cornwall's Light Infantry, reaching the rank of lieutenant, until July 1921, when he was seconded to the Royal Air Force as a flying officer. After 18 months at No. 5 Flying Training School, in December 1922 he joined No. 84 Squadron as a pilot, based in Iraq, flying DH.9As. In April 1925, he was on the staff of the RAF depot in Egypt, before joining No. 208 Squadron in January 1926. By now, Inglis had resigned his commission in the Duke of Cornwall's Light Infantry and had been appointed to a permanent commission in the rank of flying officer.

On 1 July 1927, Inglis was promoted to flight lieutenant; he was immediately placed on half pay until the end of July, having recently got married.

On his return to active service, Inglis joined the staff at No 4 Apprentice's Wing, RAF Cranwell. In April 1931, he transferred to the staff of the RAF College, until returning to Iraq in December 1933 as a member of the air staff, HQ Iraq Command. In January 1936, he returned to England, and attended the RAF Staff College at Andover. He was promoted to squadron leader on 1 April 1936 and to wing commander on 1 March 1939.

== Intelligence career ==
In January 1937, he was appointed to the staff of the deputy directorate of Intelligence, and promoted to deputy director of intelligence (3) (DDI3) in 1940. In this role, he was head of the German branch of air intelligence. He was promoted to the rank of group captain in September 1941 and to (acting) air commodore in March 1942.

In March 1942, he was promoted to director of intelligence (operations), reporting direct to the prime minister, Winston Churchill. Following the entry of the United States into the Second World War, Churchill sent Inglis to see President Roosevelt to persuade him to direct the United States war effort primarily against the German air force in Europe. Inglis stayed in the White House and held two meetings with Roosevelt, eventually persuading the president to go against his own advisors and agree to the British viewpoint, that the major American war effort must be directed towards the defeat of Germany first.

According to Inglis's brother-in-law, Air Marshal Sir Victor Goddard,

No other war decision by America was more significant for Europe and the World than that one. It is to be attributed to the clear trustworthiness of Frank Inglis that his vital, single-handed mission was successful, and it is to be attributed to his modesty that his part in that happening seems never to have come to the notice of historians.

In October 1942, Inglis was promoted to Assistant Chief of the Air Staff (Intelligence), with the military rank of acting air vice marshal, succeeding Air Vice-Marshal Charles Medhurst, thus making him head of Air Intelligence.

== Later career ==
At the end of the war, in August 1945, he was appointed Air Officer Commanding No. 23 Group, Flying Training Command (with Air Vice Marshal Sir Thomas Elmhirst succeeding him at RAF Intelligence).

On 20 January 1947, he was appointed senior air staff officer, HQ Air Command Far East and on 20 October 1949 as senior air staff officer, HQ Flying Training Command. He reached the full rank of air vice-marshal on 1 July 1947.

He retired at his own request on 29 March 1952.

== Honours ==
Air Vice Marshal Inglis was appointed a Commander of the Order of the British Empire (CBE) on 8 June 1944, and Companion of the Order of the Bath (CB) on 1 January 1946.

In October 1945, he was conferred with the honour of Commander of the United States Legion of Merit for "exceptionally meritorious conduct in the performance of outstanding service". In 1946, he was also conferred with the honour of Grand Cross of the Order of the Phoenix by the King of Greece.

In July 1957, he was appointed Deputy Lieutenant of the county of Kent.

Military offices
Preceded by Charles Medhurst	Assistant Chief of the Air Staff (Intelligence); 1942–1945	Succeeded by Thomas Elmhirst
New title	Air Officer Commanding No. 23 Group; 1945–1947	Succeeded by Arthur Ledger
