= Charles Allison =

Charles Allison may refer to:

- Charles Allison (cricketer) (1885–1968), South African cricketer
- Charles Allison (mayor) (1845–1920), 28th Mayor of Christchurch
- Charles Frederick Allison (1885–1955), Canadian merchant, philanthropist and founder of Mount Allison University
- Charles Gary Allison (1938–2008), American screenwriter and film producer
