= SS Ava =

There have been several vessels named "Ava", including:

- SS Ava (1855) – British steamship built in 1855 and operated by the Peninsular & Oriental Steam Navigation Company on the China mail service; she ran aground and was wrecked off the coast of Ceylon in February 1858.
- SS Ava (1862) – Steamship built 1862, operated between India and Burma, scrapped 1890.
- SS Ava (1873) – Steamship built 1873, owned by British India Steam Navigation Co. Ltd., sunk 1879 following collision at the mouth of the Hooghly River.
- SS Ava (1895) – Steamship built 1895, ran aground near Mawlamyine in 1905.
- SS Ava (1906) – Steamship built 1906, torpedoed and sunk by a German U-boat SW of Ireland, January 1917.
