= Julia, Lady Inglis =

The Honourable Julia, Lady Inglis
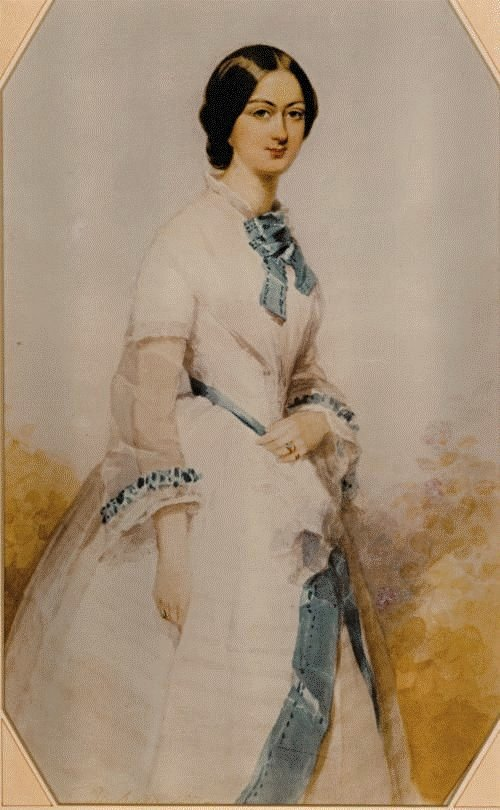
- Julia Inglis
- Born: Julia Selina Thesiger; 19 April 1833
- Died: 3 February 1904 (aged 70); Beckenham
- Notable work: Her diary of the Siege of Lucknow (1857)
- Spouse: Major-General Sir John Eardley Inglis
- Children: John Frederic Inglis; Charles George Inglis; Alfred Markham Inglis; Victoria Alexandrina Inglis; Julia Mathilda Inglis; Rupert Edward Inglis
- Parent(s): Frederic Thesiger, 1st Baron Chelmsford; Anna Maria Tinling
- Relatives: Frederic Thesiger, 2nd Baron Chelmsford (brother); Alfred Thesiger (brother)

Julia Selina, Lady Inglis (19 April 1833 – 3 February 1904) was a British memoir writer. She was the daughter of Frederic Thesiger, 1st Baron Chelmsford, and wife of Major-General Sir John Eardley Inglis, who commanded the British troops at the Siege of Lucknow in 1857. She kept a diary of her life during the siege, which was published as The Siege of Lucknow: a Diary. She aimed to give "a simple account of each day's events (which) may give a clear idea of what was done by the garrison under (her husband's) command".

== Background ==
Her father was Frederic Thesiger, a lawyer who later became a Member of Parliament, serving as Attorney-General under Robert Peel and as Lord Chancellor under Lord Derby and was created the first Baron Chelmsford.

Her mother was Anna Maria Tinling (1799–1875), daughter of William Tinling and niece of Francis Peirson, who was killed in the defence of Jersey during an attempted French invasion on 6 January 1781.

Her elder brother, Frederic (1827–1905) succeeded their father as 2nd Baron Chelmsford and led the British forces in the battles at Isandlwana and Ulundi during the Anglo-Zulu War of 1879.

== Family ==
On 19 July 1851, she married Lieutenant-Colonel John Eardley Inglis of the 32nd Regiment of Foot, who had commanded the 32nd at Suraj Kund and was present at the storming and capture of Multan, the action at Chiniot and the Battle of Gujrat, during the Second Anglo-Sikh War of 1848–49.

They had a total of seven children:

- John Frederic Inglis (b. 1852, died an infant)
- John Frederic Inglis (1853–1923), who played cricket for Kent and football for Wanderers and Scotland.
- Charles George Inglis (1855–1923), who became a tea planter on the Agra Kandy Estate in Ceylon.
- Alfred Markham Inglis (1856–1919), who played cricket for Kent.
- Victoria Alexandrina Inglis (1859–1929), who married Hubert Ashton, and was the mother of cricketers Hubert, Gilbert, Percy and Claude.
- Julia Mathilda Inglis (1861–1929), who married Sir George Herman Collier of the India Office.
- Rupert Edward Inglis (1863–1916), who was an England international rugby player and became a minister in the Church of England before serving as a chaplain in the First World War and was killed during the Battle of the Somme.

== The Siege of Lucknow ==
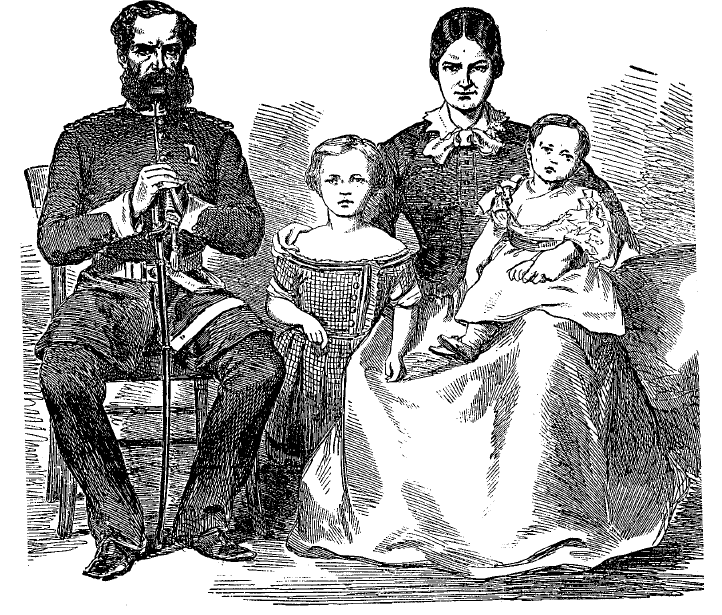
Colonel John Inglis, Julia Inglis and two of their three children. Source: Illustrated London News, 28 November 1857

By June 1857, with three sons aged under five, Julia Inglis was living at Lucknow where her husband was in command of the 32nd Foot at the start of the Indian Mutiny. On 30 June, under the overall command of Sir Henry Lawrence, the British forces had failed in a preliminary skirmish at Chinhat and retreated into the residency at Lucknow, which immediately came under siege. On 2 July, Lawrence was hit by a shell and died two days later. At Lawrence's wish, Colonel Inglis took command of the Brigade and led the defence until the arrival of Sir Henry Havelock on 26 September 1857. He remained there until the arrival of Sir Colin Campbell on 18 November.

Julia Inglis kept a diary of life during the siege which "vividly brings home the situation of the British trapped within the Residency walls". Mrs. Inglis and her three sons lived in a room which "was very small, hardly more than a verandah, about twelve feet by six feet, with no doors nor windows, only arches" (30 June) in which screens had been erected for privacy; compared to other residents, Inglis was fortunate – "In the next square to us lived a good many of the ladies, who were all together in a large room, and very uncomfortable." (30 June) She had the assistance of several servants, including her "khansamah", who acted as cook, and an "ayah" who helped with the children, whereas many wives were left with only one or two servants, and some had no help at all. (30 June)

The diary recounts the events of the siege, with movement being restricted for fear of snipers. "We felt sure the enemy must get in, when the most terrible death awaited us. We sat trembling, hardly able to breathe" (1 July). "John had a most providential escape to-day; he left his little room in the Residency house rather earlier than usual, and soon after a round shot came through the door and passed over his bed. Had he been in his room, he could hardly have been untouched." (16 July) "Mrs. Dorin was killed to-day... she was helping to carry some things upstairs, when a very small bullet struck her in the forehead and went through her head, causing instantaneous death." (21 July)

This evening I was standing outside the door with baby in my arms, talking to the ayah, when I felt something whiz past my ears. I rushed inside, and when my alarm had subsided, ventured out again to discover what it was. I found a large piece of shell embedded about ten inches deep in the earth. It had fallen on the spot where I had been standing. It was a fragment from one of our own shells, which often recoiled and fell inside our entrenchments. (23 July)

As well as attacks from the enemy, the besieged residents had to endure epidemics of cholera and small pox; Inglis herself had been taken ill with smallpox a few days before the siege commenced. (28 June)

In the diary she frequently talks about keeping the "boys" and the "baby" (Alfred) safe during the siege and retreat:

This was Johnny's fourth birthday, a sad one to us all. We managed to get some toys for Johnny from a merchant inside. (16 July)
Johnny was not well to-day, and I feared he might be sickening for small-pox. (31 July)
Johnny's rosy cheeks, which he never lost, excited great admiration; he passed most of his time in the square next to us with the Sikhs, who were very fond of him, and used to give him chappatties (native bread), though they could not have had much to eat themselves, poor men! (28 August)
Mrs. Case and Johnny were walking in the square next to ours to-day, when a Sikh officer passed them, and directly afterwards he was hit in the arm by a bullet. No place was really safe, and I never liked having the children out of my sight. (18 October)
During the siege, we had picked up a little white hen, which used to run about and pick up what it could. Just before Colonel Campbell became so very ill, we had decided to kill and eat it, when one morning Johnny ran in and said, 'Oh, mamma, the white hen has laid an egg!' We took it at once to Colonel Campbell, it being a great luxury in those days. The hen laid one every day for him till he died, and then ceased for the rest of the siege; but we would not kill it then. (12 November)
I had at first put the two boys into a dhoolie with their ayah, but they got separated from us, and it was fully a quarter of an hour before I found them, so I would not let them go from me again. . . poor baby, who was very thirsty, cried louder for it [water] than I had ever heard him before. With difficulty I pacified him, and succeeded in getting him to sleep. (19 November)

After an initial siege lasting 87 days, the residency was relieved by General Sir Henry Havelock on 26 September.

At 6 pm tremendous cheering was heard, and it was known our relief had reached us. I was standing outside our door when Ellicock rushed in for John's sword; he had not worn it since Chinhut, and a few moments afterwards he came to us accompanied by a short, quiet-looking, gray-haired man, who I knew at once was General Havelock. He shook hands with me, and said he feared we had suffered a great deal. I could hardly answer him – I longed to be with John alone, and he shared my feelings, for erelong he returned to me, and never shall I forget his heartfelt kiss as he said, 'Thank God for this!' Yes, we were safe, and my darling husband spared to me. It was a moment of unmixed happiness, but not lasting. I felt how different my lot was to others.

Unfortunately, it quickly became apparent that the relief force was inadequate to evacuate the residency:

It was evident to us, from the conversation that went on, and from the reports that were constantly coming in to the general, that though reinforced we were not relieved; indeed, John told me that himself, and our position still seemed most perilous. The opposition the force had met with in getting to us had far exceeded their expectations, and all seemed much disheartened and discouraged.

Despite the attempted first relief, life in the residency continued much as before, with frequent attacks resulting in further deaths. Eventually, on 17 November, the residency was again relieved by forces under the command of Sir Colin Campbell. "At about 4 pm two strange officers walked through our yard, leading their horses, and asking for the brigadier. One was Colonel Berkely, who had exchanged with Colonel Brooks, and had come out to command the 32nd. By this we knew communication was established between the two forces, and, that we really were relieved."

=== Evacuation ===
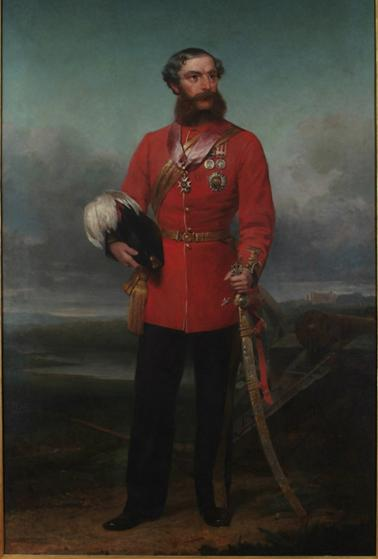
Sir John Eardley Inglis by William Gush, Province House (Nova Scotia)

Immediately, orders were given to evacuate the residency, to the dismay of the residents: "We were indeed thunderstruck, and truly grieved to think of abandoning the place we had held so long with a small force, now that it seemed to us we could have driven the enemy completely out of Lucknow, re-established our supremacy, and marched out triumphantly." The evacuation commenced on 19 November: "I turned my back on the Residency with a heavy heart, for at that time I fancied a force might still be left there, and that I was bidding farewell to my husband for some time."

An hour after leaving the residency, they arrived at Secundra Bagh, where only days before 1,200 rebels were slaughtered by the British; "Nearly 1,200 of them had been cut to pieces, no quarter being asked or granted. Their bodies had just been covered over with earth, and it sickened me to feel they were so near us."(19 November) They then moved on to Dilkusha Park, arriving about midnight. "After partaking of some refreshments, which had been kindly prepared for us by Colonel Little and the officers of the 9th Lancers, we all lay down and slept pretty soundly."

On the morning of 23 November, Mrs. Inglis was rejoined by her husband, who had remained in command of the garrison until the British forces withdrew at midnight. The following day, the evacuees left Dilkusha Park and after seven hours reached Alum Bagh, having only travelled four miles. Later that day, they received news that Havelock had died at Dilkusha. On 27 November, the party moved out of Alum Bagh headed towards the relative safety of Cawnpore, which they reached on the evening of 29 November.

With Cawnpore under renewed attack from forces led by Tantya Tope, the party were soon on the move again, leaving Cawnpore on 3 December, reaching Allahabad on 7 December, from where they were eventually taken down the River Ganges to Calcutta arriving there on 6 February 1858.

Shortly after her arrival at Calcutta, Mrs. Inglis was notified that her husband had been promoted to the rank of major-general; the promotion had been awarded to her husband "for his enduring fortitude and persevering gallantry in the defence of the Residency of Lucknow, for eighty-seven days, against an overwhelming force of the enemy". Major-General Inglis had also been appointed to the rank of Knight Commander of the Most Honourable Order of the Bath (K.C.B.) on 21 January 1858, although the news only reached Julia shortly before arriving in Suez several weeks later.

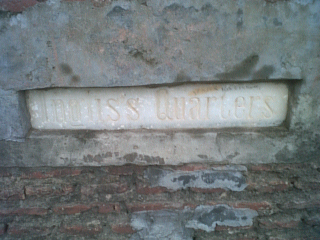
Inglis's Quarters in the ruins of Residency in Lucknow, circa 2014

== Shipwreck ==
Following the retreat from Lucknow, Lady Inglis and her three children returned to England on board the SS Ava; the ship set out from Calcutta for Suez on 10 February 1858, but ran aground off Pigeon Island, about 12 miles from Trincomalee, Ceylon on 16 February. The passengers and crew were rescued after spending a night in the ship's boats. "Johnny was delighted when [the waves] broke over the boat, and his merry laugh sounded sadly in my ears, for I quite thought that a watery grave awaited each one of us". The family eventually reached Alexandria before travelling on to Southampton, arriving there in early March.

The family were re-united when Sir John arrived back in London on 20 May 1858.

== Diary ==
In 1892, more than thirty years after the events at Lucknow, Lady Inglis decided to publish her diary saying that she thought it "may prove interesting to my relations and friends" and would give "the present generation a clearer knowledge of the defence of Lucknow, and greater appreciation of the services of those engaged in it". She presented a copy to Queen Victoria, it is now part of the Royal Library. The diary has been variously described as "absorbing" and "blood-curdling".

== Later life ==
After his return from India, Sir John suffered from poor health: "the continued suffering which he had undergone in India, and the almost total loss of sleep, had shaken his constitution, originally strong and robust." He was appointed colonel of the 32nd light infantry on 5 May 1860, and soon after he was sent to Corfu to take command of the troops in the Ionian Islands. His failing health soon led to his retirement from active service, when he was advised by his physicians to take a course of treatment at the baths at Homburg in Germany; unfortunately, this was in vain and he died there on 27 September 1862, aged 47.

Lady Inglis later held the honorary position of "Housekeeper" of the State apartments of St James's Palace. After her husband's death she lived at Beckenham where she died on 3 February 1904.
