= Gilbert Ashton =

English cricketer (1896–1981)

Personal information
- Born: 27 September 1896; Bromley, Kent, England
- Died: 6 February 1981 (aged 84); Abberley, Worcestershire, England
- Batting: Right-handed
- Bowling: Leg-break

Domestic team information
- Years: Team
- 1919—1921: Cambridge University
- 1922—1936: Worcestershire

Career statistics
Competition	FC
Matches	62
Runs scored	2,329
Batting average	24.01
100s/50s	2/13
Top score	125
Balls bowled	626
Wickets	14
Bowling average	37.21
5 wickets in innings	0
10 wickets in match	0
Best bowling	3–49
Catches/stumpings	26/0
- Source: CricketArchive, 9 July 2008

Gilbert Ashton MC (27 September 1896 – 6 February 1981) was an English cricketer who played 62 first-class matches between the wars, mostly for Cambridge University (whom he captained in 1921, and also captained at football) and Worcestershire. His obituary in Wisden called him "a fine, aggressive stroke-player" and praised his fielding ability at cover point. His bowling was of the occasional variety, and after he left Cambridge became essentially non-existent.

== Career ==
Ashton played less cricket than his ability merited as his "day job" for four decades from 1921 until 1961 was that of headmaster of the prep school of Abberley Hall School near Worcester. However, he played for Worcestershire when he could during the holidays, and in 1922, on only his second appearance for the county, he made 125 (his career-best) and 84 in a match against Northamptonshire at New Road. Wisden's obituary also praised his 36 for an England XI against Warwick Armstrong's Australians a year earlier, which gave the English hope after having been dismissed for 43 in the first innings, and helped lay the ground for a fine victory.

After 1927, Ashton ceased to play even semi-regular county cricket, and indeed after that year he was to make only two more first-class appearances: against Northamptonshire in June 1934 and, finally, against Leicestershire in July 1936. He did very little in either game. He did, however, play a minor single-innings game for his county against the Royal Air Force aged 47 in 1944; he was lbw for nought.

Before going up to Trinity College, Cambridge, Ashton had been captain of the Winchester College XI. Upon leaving the school, he served in the First World War in the Royal Field Artillery; it was at this time that he won his MC, the citation for which reads:

For conspicuous gallantry in action. He repeatedly repaired his telephone line under a very heavy fire, and maintained communication with his Battery all day."

He also lost his left thumb during the war, although this was said not to have affected the quality of his fielding in later years. After retiring from playing, Ashton served as a magistrate, and was also President of Worcestershire County Cricket Club from 1967 to 1969. He was appointed a Deputy Lieutenant of Worcestershire in 1968.

== Family ==
Ashton's mother, Victoria Alexandrina Inglis, was the daughter of Sir John Eardley Wilmot Inglis, who commanded the British forces at the Siege of Lucknow, and Julia Selina Thesiger.

A number of his relatives played first-class cricket: his brothers Claude and Hubert had substantial careers for Cambridge and Essex, while another brother, Percy, had one game for Essex. Two uncles, Alfred Inglis and John Inglis reached first-class level briefly in the 1880s. Finally, Ashton's brother-in-law Ralph Huband played twice for Cambridge in 1923.
