= Ralph Huband =

Irish cricketer

Personal information
- Full name: Ralph Croft Huband
- Born: 19 June 1902; Killiskey, Ireland
- Died: 7 November 1964 (aged 62); Lambeth, London, England
- Batting: Right-handed
- Role: Wicket-keeper
- Relatives: Gilbert Ashton (brother-in-law)

Domestic team information
- Years: Team
- 1923: Cambridge University

Career statistics
Competition	First-class
Matches	2
Runs scored	64
Batting average	32.00
100s/50s	–/1
Top score	61*
Catches/stumpings	–/–
- Source: Cricinfo, 10 January 2022

Ralph Croft Huband (19 June 1902 – 7 November 1964) was an Irish first-class cricketer and educator.

The son of The Reverend Hugo Richard Huband and his wife, Adelaide, he was born at Killiskey in June 1902. He was educated at Winchester College, where he played for the college cricket team as a wicket-keeper. He was present in the match against Eton College in 1920, when John Guise scored 278 runs. From Winchester he went up to Pembroke College, Cambridge. While studying at Cambridge, he played first-class cricket for Cambridge University Cricket Club in 1923, making two appearances against Middlesex at Fenner's and the Marylebone Cricket Club at Lord's. He had success against Middlesex, scoring 61 not out in a 120 runs stand for the ninth wicket with Gubby Allen. He did not gain a blue, with his appearances for the university limited due to the presence of wicket-keepers Dar Lyon and Noel Sherwell in the Cambridge team. After graduating from Cambridge, Huband went into education. He was for many years the headmaster of Lockers Park School in England, where amongst his pupils was the Nawab of Pataudi, who captained India in Test cricket during the 1960s and 1970s. Huband died at Lambeth in November 1964.
