= Bill Inglis =

Bill Inglis may refer to:

- Bill Inglis (ice hockey) (born 1943), ice hockey centre
- Bill Inglis (footballer, born 1894) (1894–1968), Scottish footballer
- Bill Inglis (footballer, born 1899) (1899–1977), English footballer and manager

== See also ==
- William Inglis (disambiguation)
