= Percy Ashton =

Indian-born English cricketer

- Born: 27 February 1895
- Died: 18 September 1934 (aged 39)
- Occupation: First-class cricketer

Percy Ashton MC (27 February 1895 – 18 September 1934) was an Indian-born English first-class cricketer. He was a right-arm medium-fast bowler who played for Essex. He was born in Calcutta and died in Bigbury-on-Sea.

Ashton, who also played for Marylebone Cricket Club and Reigate Priory in miscellaneous matches in 1922 and 1928 respectively, made a single first-class appearance for Essex during the 1924 season, against Middlesex. From the lower-middle order, he scored 31 runs in the first innings in which he batted and 21 runs in the second.

Ashton took figures of 1-55 from a 12-over spell with the ball, taking the wicket of Patsy Hendren.

== Family ==
Ashton's mother, Victoria Alexandrina Inglis, was the daughter of Sir John Eardley Wilmot Inglis, who commanded the British forces at the Siege of Lucknow and Julia Selina Thesiger.

Ashton's brothers, Claude, Hubert, and Gilbert Ashton, and uncles Alfred and John Inglis also played first-class cricket. Ashton was, like his brothers Gilbert and Hubert, awarded the Military Cross
