= Charles Frederick Allison =

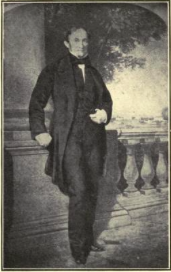
- Charles Frederick Allison by William Gush
- Born: January 25, 1795; Cornwallis, Nova Scotia, Canada
- Died: November 20, 1858 (aged 63); Sackville, New Brunswick, Canada
- Occupations: Merchant; Philanthropist
- Spouse: Milcah Trueman (1840-1858)

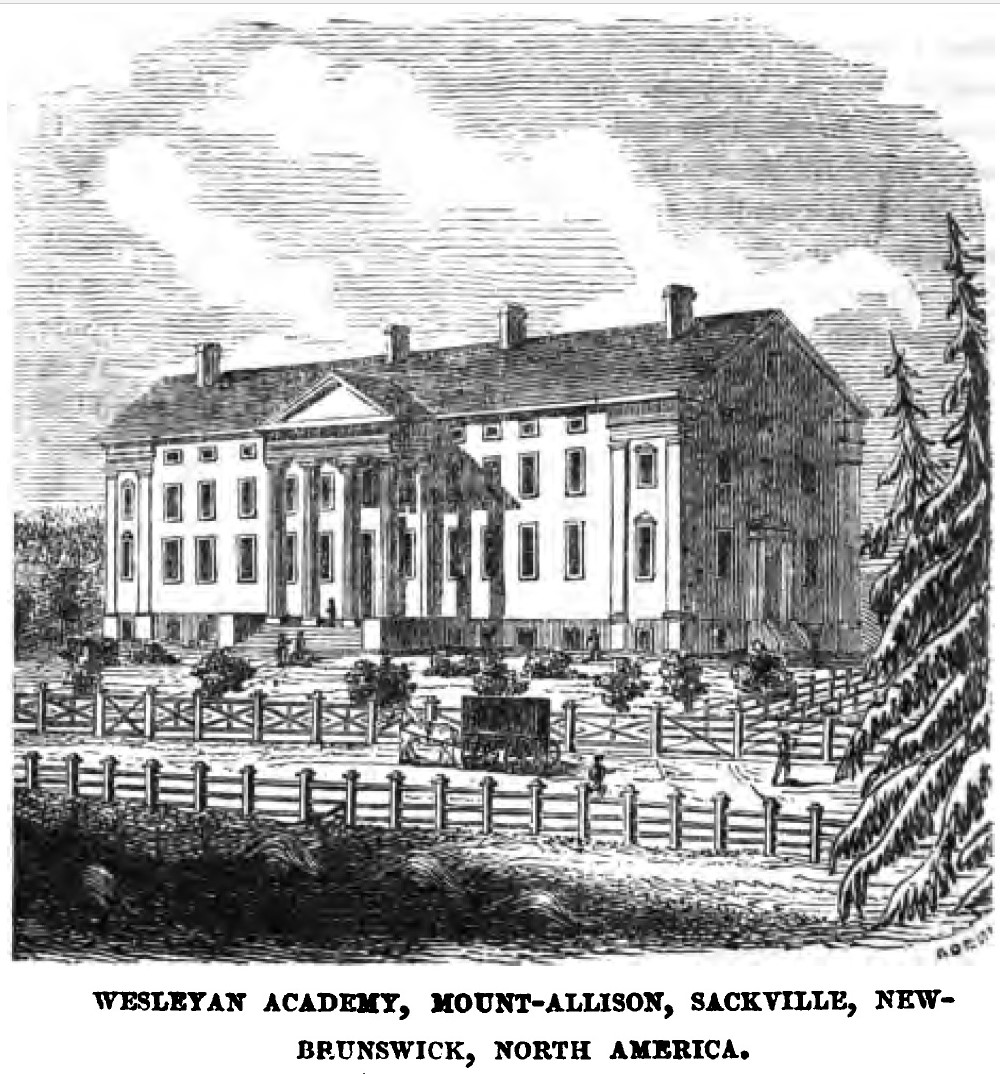
Wesleyan Academy, Mount-Allison, Sackville, New-Brunswick, North America (1852)

Charles Frederick Allison (January 25, 1795 – November 20, 1858) was a Canadian merchant, philanthropist, and the founder of Mount Allison University.

== Background ==
Allison's grandfather Joseph had emigrated from Ireland to Canada in the late 18th century because of the after effects of a dinner with the local government tax collector. Wanting to impress the man, the family had set the table with their one valuable possession: silver spoons. After entertaining their guest, the Allisons were informed by the tax collector that if they could afford silver spoons, then they could certainly afford to pay more taxes. The Allisons left Ireland shortly thereafter. The offending spoons are now on display in the main university library.

== Early life ==
Allison was born in Nova Scotia but arrived in Sackville, New Brunswick in 1816 at the age of 21.

== Mount Allison University ==
In June 1839, Allison was encouraged by Wesleyan Methodist Minister Reverend John Bass Strong that a school of elementary and higher learning be built. He offered to purchase a site in Sackville, to erect a suitable building for an academy, and to contribute operating funds of 100 pounds a year for 10 years. This offer was accepted and the Wesleyan Academy for boys subsequently opened in 1843.
