= Dudley Pope (cricketer) =

English cricketer

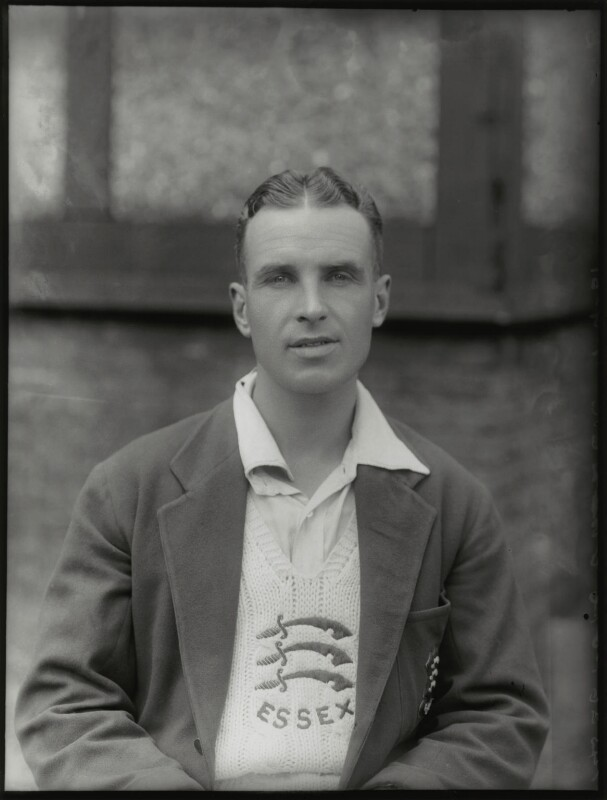
- Pope in 1931

Personal information
- Full name: Dudley Fairbridge Pope
- Born: 28 October 1906; Barnes, England
- Died: 8 September 1934 (aged 27); Writtle, Essex, England
- Batting: Right-handed
- Role: Batsman

Domestic team information
- Years: Team
- 1925–1927: Gloucestershire
- 1928–1934: Essex

Career statistics
Competition	First-class
Matches	159
Runs scored	6,557
Batting average	26.33
100s/50s	7/31
Top score	161
Balls bowled	348
Wickets	4
Bowling average	68.00
5 wickets in innings	0
10 wickets in match	0
Best bowling	1/11
Catches/stumpings	37/–
- Source: CricInfo, 13 September 2009

Dudley Fairbridge Pope (28 October 1906 – 8 September 1934) was an English cricketer. A right-handed batsman, Pope was born in Barnes and is recorded in the 1911 United Kingdom census as living in Richmond, Surrey at age four.

For the bulk of his career, Pope remained with Essex, after a couple of seasons with Gloucestershire. He played 159 first-class matches for Essex and Gloucestershire between 1925 and his death in a car accident in 1934. He scored 6,557 runs at 26.33, including seven centuries, and formed a "solid professional nucleus" along with such players as Jim Cutmore, Laurie Eastman, Jack O'Connor, Jack Russell and Stan Nichols. In 1933, Pope, along with many of these players, scored over 1,000 runs, the first time six Essex batsmen had topped 1,000 in a season.
