= Claude Ashton =

English footballer and cricketer

Claude Thesiger Ashton
- Born: 19 February 1901; Calcutta, British India
- Died: 31 October 1942 (aged 41)
- Education: Winchester College; Trinity College, Cambridge
- Occupation: Amateur footballer First-class cricketer

Claude Thesiger Ashton (19 February 1901 – 31 October 1942) was an English amateur footballer and first-class cricketer. As footballer he played for Corinthians in several different positions including goalkeeper and centre forward, although his preferred position was wing-half. He made one appearance for the England national team in 1925 when he was appointed team captain. As a cricketer he played for Cambridge University and Essex. A pre-war officer of the Auxiliary Air Force, he died as a result of a mid-air collision in a training accident in the Second World War.

== Early life ==
Ashton was born in Calcutta, India and was the youngest of four sons of Hubert Shorrock Ashton and of Victoria Alexandrina Ashton (née Inglis). Ashton's mother, Victoria, was the daughter of Sir John Eardley Wilmot Inglis, who commanded the British forces at the Siege of Lucknow, and Julia Selina Thesiger.

His brothers included Hubert, Gilbert and Percy, all of whom played first-class cricket. Claude was educated at Winchester College where he was captain of cricket, football, racquets and fives. He then went up to Trinity College, Cambridge and earned his blue at hockey, cricket and football. When Claude Ashton and his two brothers, Hubert and Gilbert, were together in the Cambridge football team of 1920, the university side earned itself the nickname of "Ashton Villa". Although he became football captain in his third year at University, he was unable to take part in the 1923 match against Oxford University.

== Cricket career ==
Claude Ashton
Cricket information
- Batting: Right-handed
- Bowling: Right-arm medium

Career statistics
Competition	First-class
Matches	127
Runs scored	4,723
Batting average	24.98
100s/50s	4/26
Top score	118
Balls bowled	7,718
Wickets	139
Bowling average	30.92
5 wickets in innings	5
10 wickets in match	1
Best bowling	7/51
Catches/stumpings	113/–
- Source: CricketArchive, 28 December 2021

Ashton first played for the University Cricket eleven in May 1921, and in 1921 he made 557 runs for the university at an average of 46.41. His best scores were 101 not out off the Surrey bowlers at the Oval and with 98 against M.C.C. at Lord's. In the match against Oxford University in July, he played alongside his brothers Gilbert (captain) and Hubert making 48 runs (with Hubert scoring 118) as Cambridge won by an innings and 24 runs.

After the varsity match, Claude joined Hubert at Essex with only modest success, scoring 240 at an average of 18.46. With one appearance for the England XI against Australia, his aggregate for the season was 798 at an average of 29.55.

In July 1922, he again joined Hubert (now captain) in the varsity match which was won by an innings and 100 runs, after Hubert (on 90) (with Percy Chapman on 102) declared at 403 for four wickets. As a result, Claude was unable to bat and only bowled three overs without claiming a wicket. Rain interfered with many matches in 1922 but Claude's aggregate for the university and Essex for the year was 797 runs, average 28.46. His best performance came in early August against Middlesex, when he scored 110 not out in a drawn match.

For 1923, he succeeded his two elder brothers as captain of Cambridge University, but was unable to emulate his brothers in the varsity match. Oxford batted all the first day, and during the night a severe thunderstorm with a deluge of rain completely altered the conditions at Lord's, with the result that Cambridge were dismissed twice and beaten on the Tuesday by an innings and 227 runs, the most overwhelming defeat in the whole series of university matches and the three most decisive results to occur consecutively. Claude thus ended his time with the university in rather dismal circumstances.

In the 1923 season as a whole, however, he amassed 916 runs at an average of 24.75, and claimed 50 wickets with his medium-pace bowling, together with 21 catches.

Over the next few years, his business commitments restricted his cricket and between 1930 and 1933 he played no first-class cricket. After a five-year absence from first-class cricket, he returned for Essex at the end of May 1934 in a match against Kent at Brentwood. In an astonishing match Kent scored 803 for four wickets, with Bill Ashdown scoring 332, Frank Woolley 172 and Les Ames 202 n.o. (185 runs were scored off Ashton's 31 overs). In reply, Essex managed 408 in the first innings, with centuries from Dudley Pope and Jack O'Connor, while Ashton could only contribute 11. Following on, Essex were bowled out for 203, with Ashton making 71 not out.

A few days later, he made his highest first-class score of 118 against Surrey (again at Brentwood), helping O'Connor put on 287 for the fifth wicket, a then Essex record, in a total of 570, which brought victory by an innings and 192. The stand occupied only two hours twenty minutes, and the fourth hundred of the innings came in 38 minutes. The combined total of runs scored in these two matches was 2362. In six games for Essex in 1934, Ashton scored 416 runs and headed the averages with 59.42.

His fourth and final century came against Gloucestershire in July 1936, when he scored 100 in a drawn match, thereby passing a career total of 4500 runs.

His first-class cricket career spanned 18 years from 1921 to 1938 during which he scored an aggregate of 4723 runs at an average of 24.98, took 139 wickets as a bowler, and held 113 catches.

== Football career ==
=== Corinthians ===
At Cambridge University, he became football captain in his third year, but unable to take part in the 1923 match against Oxford University. After graduating, he played for Old Wykehamists, and he, Hubert and Gilbert occupied the inside-forward positions for Old Wykehamists in Arthur Dunn Cup ties.

Whilst at university, he joined his two brothers at Corinthian, making his first appearance on 18 December 1920 playing at wing-half in a 4–2 victory over Brighton and Hove Albion. In the next match, against the Isthmian League, he played at inside left alongside his two brothers. Over the next two seasons he generally played as a forward, before reverting to left-half in 1923–24, occasionally dropping back into defence. On 29 November 1924 he played in goal against Oxford University deputising for Benjamin Howard Baker.

For the 1925–26 season, he was restored to the forward line with great success. Over the next five seasons, he scored 103 goals from 89 appearances, including five goals against Northern Nomads on 24 December 1927, United Hospitals on 20 October 1928 and The Army on 19 January 1929. He played for the "Amateurs" in the 1929 FA Charity Shield. In 1932 he dropped back into midfield and ended his career with the Corinthians in November 1934.

His final appearance for Corinthian came in an FA Cup first round tie against Watford on 24 November 1934, which was lost 2–0. In his fifteen seasons with Corinthian, he appeared in all 20 FA Cup ties played by Corinthian, scoring seven goals including a pair against Walsall on 8 January 1927 and a hat-trick in a 5–0 victory at Norwich City in the third round on 12 January 1929. His first goal against Norwich came at thirty minutes when he scored with a drive, following a pass from Jackie Hegan. He increased the lead two minutes before the break after a cross from Hegan, when he "proceeded to slot the ball gently past the surprised goalkeeper". His third goal came near the end of the game when he ran through to complete his hat-trick. He also scored Corinthian's consolation goal in a 3–1 defeat by Newcastle United at Crystal Palace in front of a crowd of 56,338 on 29 January 1927.

In his career with Corinthian, he played a total of 208 matches, only exceeded by Tommy Whewell and Benjamin Howard Baker, and scored 145 goals.

=== England ===
He was selected for the England national team for the match against Northern Ireland at Windsor Park, Belfast on 24 October 1925, and was appointed captain for his solitary appearance for the full national side, playing at centre-forward. He did not have a particularly memorable game, failing to "give cohesion to his line and his shooting was weak". He was generally considered to be a good tackler and dribbler, but weak in the air. The game ended in a 0–0 draw. He was the last player to captain England in his only international.

He also made 12 appearances for the England Amateur XI.

== Hockey ==
Whilst at Cambridge, he twice played hockey against Oxford. After retiring from football, he joined the Beckenham hockey club and was given a trial for England.

== Life outside sport ==
On graduating from Cambridge University, he qualified as a Chartered Accountant, and later worked in the London Stock Exchange.

He was married to Isabel Norman-Butler and had three children. His wife's sister was married to George Abell who played cricket for Worcestershire and Oxford University.

He was commissioned as an acting pilot officer in No. 909 (County of Essex) (Balloon) Squadron, Auxiliary Air Force on 5 July 1938, he was promoted to flying officer later that year. He was called to active service at the outbreak of the Second World War, and was promoted flight lieutenant on 18 September 1939. On 25 February 1942 he transferred to the General Duties Branch for flight training, reverting to the rank of flying officer. He was posted in rank of squadron leader to No. 256 Squadron RAF and was killed on 31 October 1942, when as a navigator/observer flying in a Bristol Beaufighter X7845 it collided in mid-air with a Vickers Wellington during a training mission near Caernarfon, North Wales. The pilot of his Beaufighter was Squadron Leader Roger Winlaw, a fellow Old Wykehamist who had played 52 games for Cambridge and Surrey. He is buried in the Ingatestone and Fryerning Cemetery in Essex.

== See also ==
- List of England international footballers born outside England
- List of English cricket and football players
