= William Inglis =

William Inglis may refer to:

- William Inglis (auctioneer) (1832–1896), Australian auctioneer
  - William Inglis & Son, Australian bloodstock auction company
- William Inglis (British Army officer) (1764–1835), British officer and Governor of Cork
- William Inglis (knight), Scottish knight
- William Beresford Inglis (died 1967), Scottish architect
- William Inglis (ferry), a 1935 Toronto Island ferry
- William Inglis (surgeon) (1713–1792), Scottish surgeon
- William D. Inglis (1874–1969), American football player and coach

== See also ==
- Bill Inglis (disambiguation)
