= William Gush =

English painter

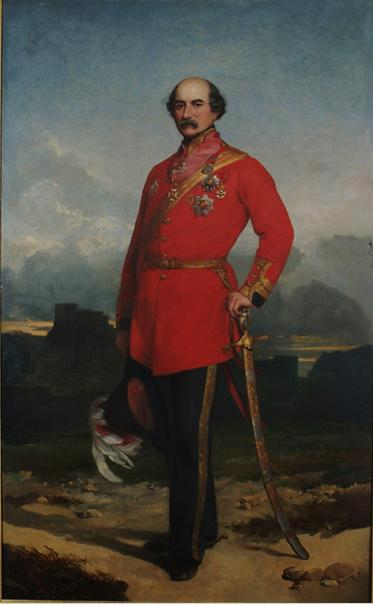
Sir William Williams, 1st Baronet, of Kars by William Gush (Province House (Nova Scotia))

William Gush (23 April 1813 – 28 February 1888) was an English portrait painter born near London. He was the oldest child of Aaron and Elizabeth Gush. Already at the age of 11, in 1924 he became copyist at the National Gallery in London. He lived at 40 Camden Square, Camden, London between 1860 and 1864. William Gush was married to Elizabeth Phillips Rollings. The couple had five children. He worked in Canada too, where he stayed for several months in 1858. Altogether, 354 portraits are known.

== Gallery ==
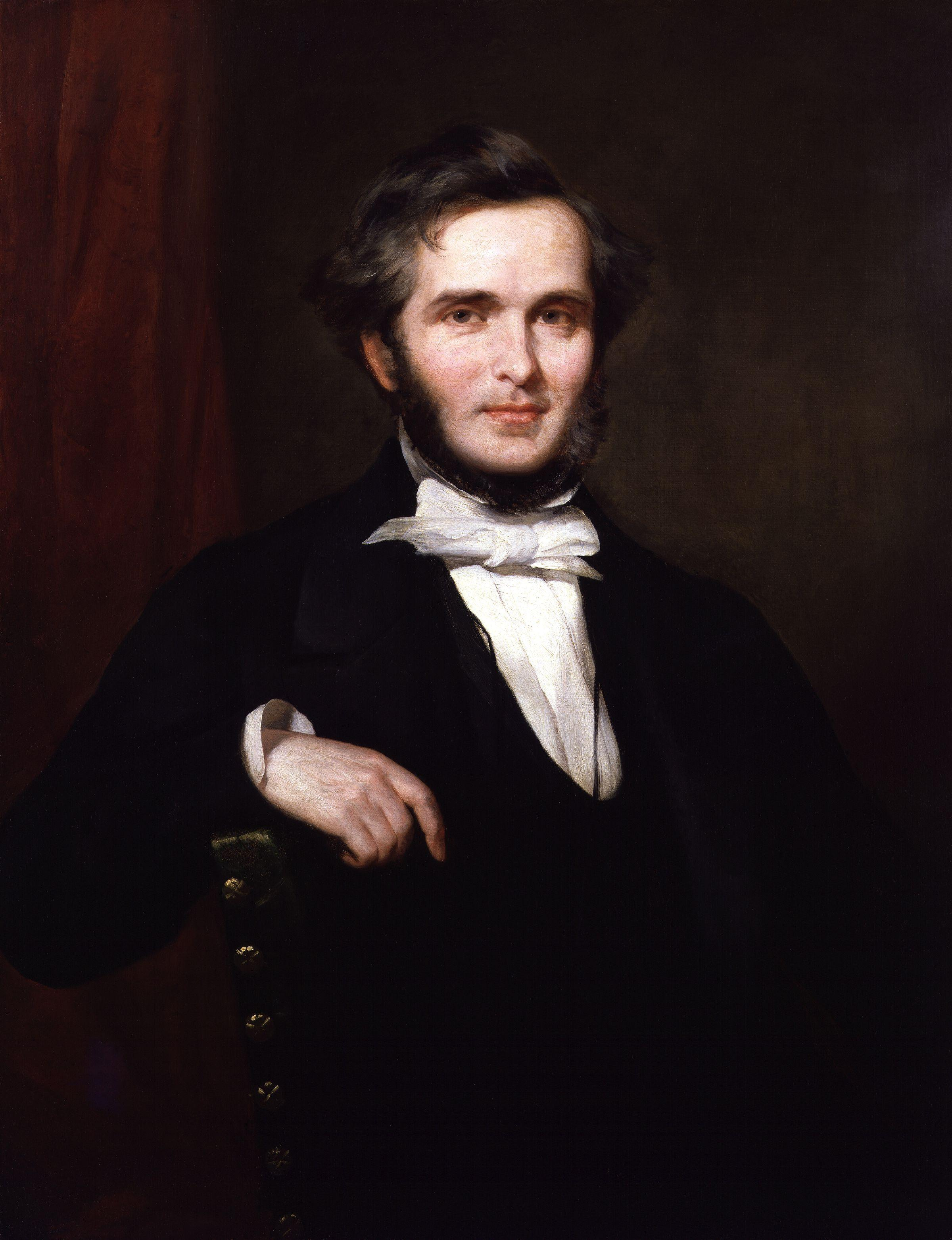
John Curwen

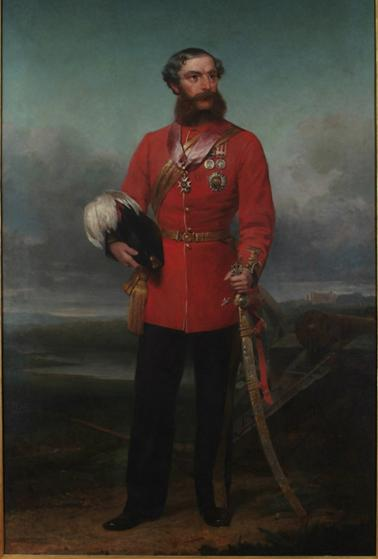
Sir John Eardley Inglis, Province House (Nova Scotia)

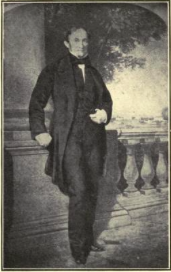
Charles Frederick Allison

== Works ==
- Charles Wesley
- Sir John Harrison Yallop, late mayor of Norwich. (1833)
- Duke of Beaufort, in the uniform of the Gloucester Yeomanry Cavalry
- Frederick Aaron,
- Abraham and Susannah Riddiford.
- Lieutenant Colonel Townsend of the 14th Royal Light Dragoons
- Reverend James Henry Monk Lord Bishop of Gloucester and Bristol, painted for the Bishop’s College in Clifton exhibited in 1842
- the Richard White, 1st Earl of Bantry (1767–1851) exhibited in 1844.
- Mrs Mills.
- Lieutenant General Sir William Fenwick Williams of Kars, Bart., KCB is
- Charles Frederick Allison, the founder of the University.
- Charles Allison’s wife and daughter
- Reverend Humphrey Pickard
- Reverend John Beecham, the first president of the Wesleyan Conference of Eastern British America
- John Curwen, a writer on music.
- Sir John Eardley Inglis
- Mrs Philip Vanderbyl
- At Lessons
- and Blackberries
- The New Song (1874)
