= Neil Inglis =

Scottish footballer

Personal information
- Full name: Neil David Inglis
- Date of birth: 10 September 1974 (age 52)
- Place of birth: Glasgow, Scotland
- Height: 1.85 m (6 ft 1 in)
- Position: Goalkeeper

Youth career
- Rangers

Senior career*
Years	Team	Apps	(Gls)
–1995	Rangers	0	(0)
1995–1996	Falkirk	1	(0)
1996–1998	Greenock Morton	5	(0)
1998	→ Clydebank (loan)	5	(0)
1998	Clydebank	1	(0)
1998–1999	Linfield		
1999–2000	Queen's Park	47	(0)
2000–2002	Ards		
2002–2004	Berwick Rangers	36	(0)
2004–2006	Arbroath	36	(0)
- Bellshill Athletic
2007	Dunfermline Athletic	0	(0)
- * Club domestic league appearances and goals

Neil Inglis (born 10 September 1974) is a Scottish retired professional footballer who played as a goalkeeper in the Scottish League for a number of clubs, most notably Queen's Park, Berwick Rangers and Arbroath. After his retirement, he became a goalkeeping coach for Dunfermline Athletic.

== Honours ==
Linfield

- Irish League Cup: 1998–99

Queen's Park

- Scottish League Third Division: 1999–00

Ards

- Irish League First Division: 2000–01
