= Francis Pigou =

Anglican priest

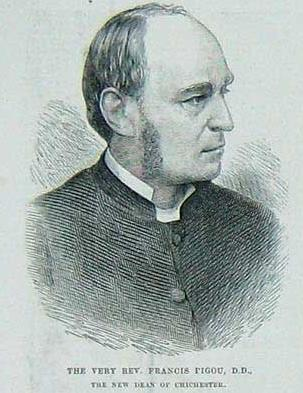
Pigou in 1888

Francis Pigou (3 January 1832 – 25 January 1916) was an Anglican priest in the second half of the 19th century and the early part of the 20th.

== Career ==
He was born in Baden-Baden, Grand Duchy of Baden, and educated at Ripon Grammar School and Trinity College, Dublin. He was ordained in 1856 and became a Curate at St Andrew, Stoke Talmage, then Chaplain at Marbœuf Chapel, Paris. He held incumbencies at St Peter, Vere Street, St Philip, Regent Street and St George, Doncaster during which time he became an Honorary Chaplain to the Queen.

He was Rural Dean of Halifax from 1875 and held an honorary canonry in the Chapter of Ripon Cathedral. He was also chaplain to the 2nd West York Yeomanry Cavalry and to the Rifle Volunteers. In 1888 he became Dean of Chichester.

Pigou found life to be unbearably sleepy in Chichester and castigated it unsparingly complaining that there was so little to do. While at Chichester he absented himself a great deal and was overjoyed, when after three years, he became Dean of Bristol, a post that offered him more scope for his energy.

== Family ==
On 3 January 1860 he married Mary, née Somers; they had two daughters. One daughter, Ernestine, was married to Alfred Inglis (1856–1919), who played cricket for Kent.

Mary died in 1868. In January 1869 Pigou married Harriet Maude, née Gambier.

Pigou died at Bristol on 25 January 1916.

Church of England titles
Preceded by John William Burgon	Dean of Chichester; 1888 – 1891	Succeeded by Richard William Randall
Preceded by Gilbert Elliott	Dean of Bristol; 1891 – 1916	Succeeded by Basil Wynne Willson
