= John Gilchrist Inglis =

Royal Navy Vice Admiral (1906–1972)

Vice-Admiral Sir John Gilchrist Inglis KBE CB
- Born: 8 June 1906; Frittenden, England
- Died: 29 October 1972 (aged 66); Wield Manor, near Old Alresford, Hampshire, England
- Relatives: Air Vice Marshal Frank Inglis (cousin)
- Military career
- Allegiance: United Kingdom
- Branch: Royal Navy
- Service years: 1924–1960
- Rank: Vice-Admiral
- Nickname: Tommy
- Commands: Director of Naval Intelligence (1954–60); HMS Sheffield (1952–53); HMS Atheling (1945–46)
- Conflicts: Second World War; Cold War
- Awards: Knight Commander of the Order of the British Empire; Companion of the Order of the Bath

Vice-Admiral Sir John Gilchrist Thesiger Inglis, KBE, CB (8 June 1906 – 29 October 1972), sometimes known as Tommy Inglis, was a Royal Navy officer who served as Director of Naval Intelligence from 1954 to 1960. In this capacity, he attempted to cover-up the "Buster Crabb affair" in 1956.

== Family ==
Inglis was born in Frittenden, near Cranbrook, Kent, the second child and only son of Rev. Rupert Inglis (1863–1916) and Helen Mary Gilchrist. His father was a former England international rugby player who became a chaplain to the British Army and was killed during the Battle of the Somme.

In 1945, Inglis married Maude Dorrien "Frankie" Frankland; they had one daughter, Sarah (born 1948), who married twice, first to Hugh Poole-Warren and then to Brig. Hedley Duncan, who was Yeoman Usher of the Black Rod until his retirement in March 2009.

His cousin, Frank Inglis was head of RAF Intelligence during the Second World War.

== Naval career ==
Inglis was educated at the Royal Naval Colleges at Osborne and Dartmouth. He graduated as a midshipman in May 1924 and first saw service on the C-class light cruiser HMS Carysfort with the Atlantic Fleet between September 1924 and January 1925.

In November 1925, he was posted to the battlecruiser HMS Hood until May 1926. He was then promoted to (acting) sub-lieutenant in September 1926 before attending a promotion course at the Royal Naval College, Greenwich until July 1927. On completion of the course, he achieved the full rank of sub-lieutenant before serving on board the Arabis-class sloop HMS Wistaria in the West Indies until August 1929. In April 1929 he was promoted to lieutenant. He then returned to the Atlantic Fleet on board the County-class heavy cruiser HMS Norfolk until February 1931.

In December 1931, he qualified for signal duties at HM Signal School, Portsmouth. After completing the course in September 1932, he was posted as signal officer to HMS Keith with the Mediterranean Fleet before returning to shore as signal officer at HMS Ganges at Shotley in April 1936. Having been promoted to the rank of lieutenant commander in April 1937, he served as flag lieutenant-commander to Vice-Admiral John Tovey, the commander of the destroyer flotillas of the Mediterranean Fleet and then as squadron signal and wireless/telegraphy officer on board the destroyer depot ship HMS Woolwich, later transferring to the Arethusa-class light cruiser HMS Galatea.

Following the outbreak of the Second World War, he continued to serve under Vice-Admiral Tovey, on board HMS Delhi until April 1940. In December 1940, he was promoted to commander and, in August 1941, he was posted as fleet wireless/telegraphy officer with the Home Fleet on board HMS King George V, before transferring to its sister ship, HMS Duke of York.

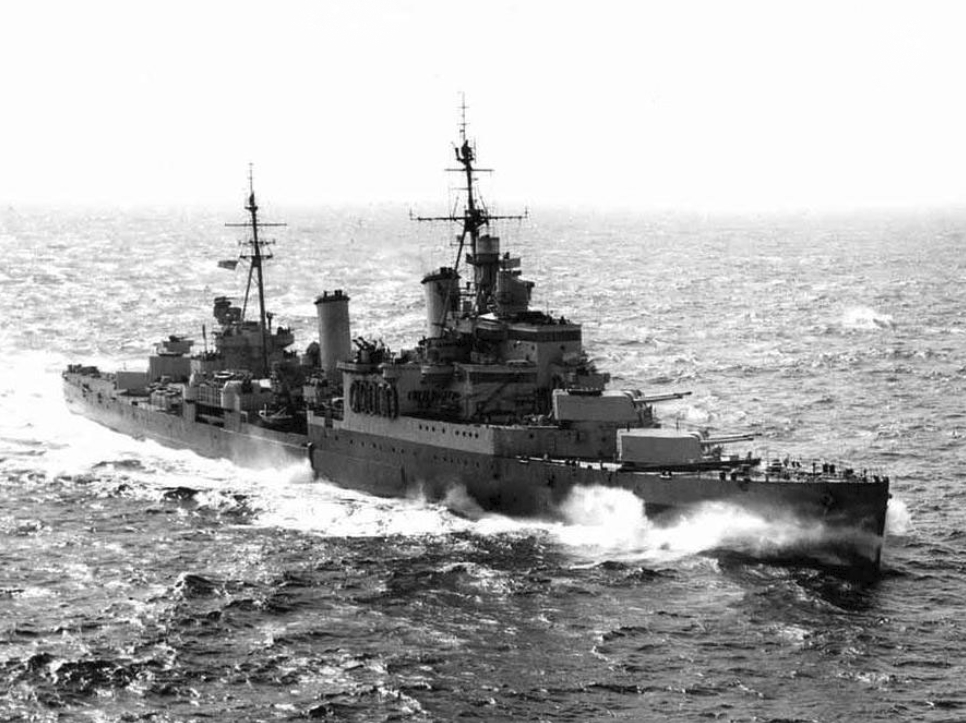
HMS Sheffield

In November 1943, he was posted to the signal school at HMS Mercury, near Petersfield for eight months, following which he was again promoted, to the rank of captain. As captain, his first command came in October 1945 on the escort carrier HMS Atheling.

After six months, he returned to shore in January 1947 to join the Admiralty at HMS President in London, being appointed as Naval Assistant to the Deputy Chief of Naval Personnel. In March 1949, he was transferred to HMS St Angelo in Malta, as captain of the fleet on the Mediterranean station, until May 1950. He then returned to the U.K. to take up the post of captain of the Signals School at HMS Mercury from September 1950 until October 1951. From June 1952 to May 1953, he was in command of the Town-class cruiser HMS Sheffield and flag captain to the Flag Officer (Heavy Squadron) of the Home Fleet.

In July 1954, he was promoted to rear admiral and appointed Director of Naval Intelligence, in which role he served until his retirement in January 1960, having reached the rank of vice admiral in January 1958.

== "Buster Crabb Affair" ==
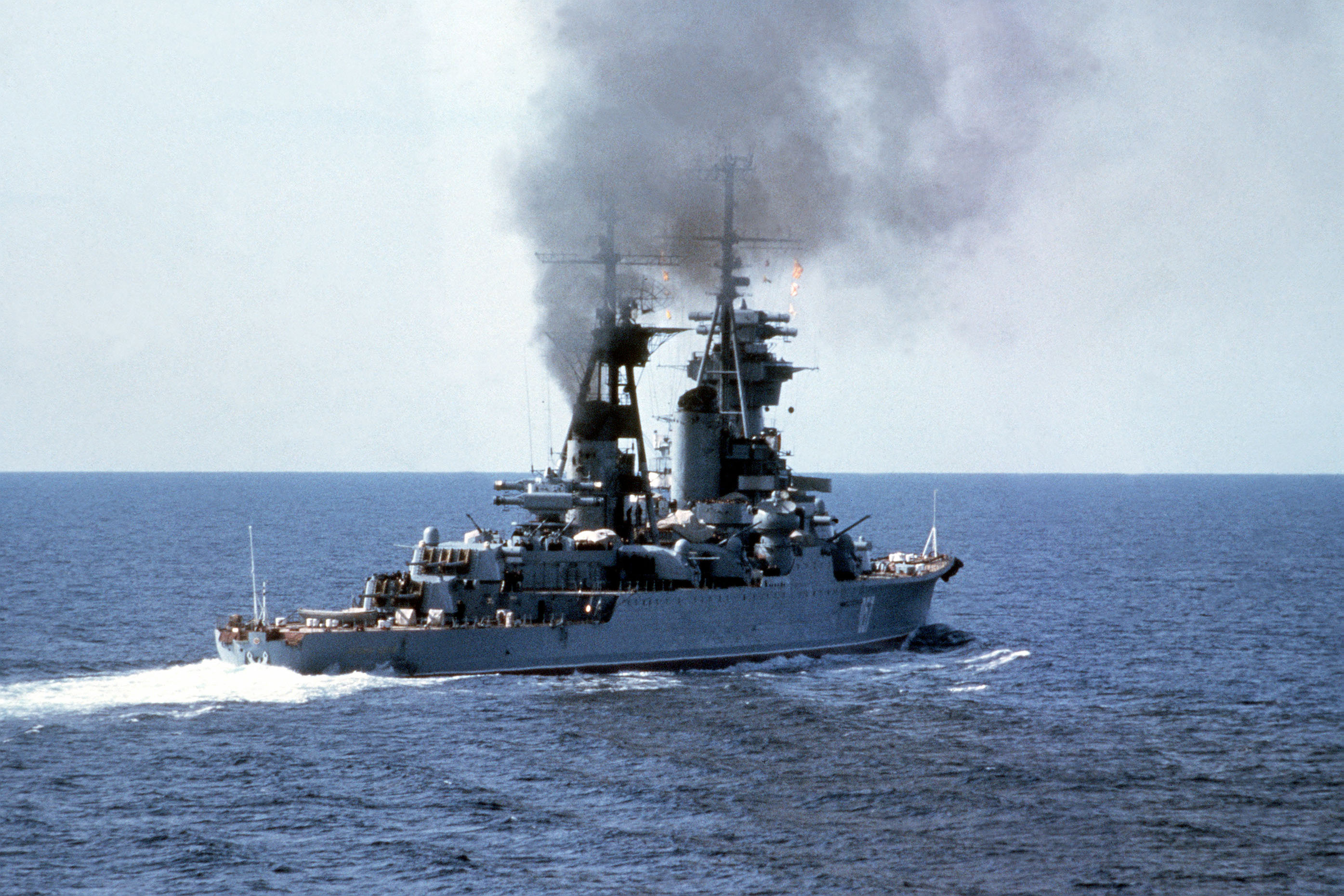
Ordzhonikidze was a Sverdlov-class cruiser similar to that shown in this photograph (Alexander Nevsky).

In April 1956, the Soviet leaders Nikita Khrushchev and Nikolai Bulganin visited England on a diplomatic mission on board the cruiser Ordzhonikidze. While the vessel was in Portsmouth, a former Royal Navy diver Lionel "Buster" Crabb was recruited to investigate her propeller. On 19 April, Crabb dived into the harbour and disappeared in mysterious circumstances; ten days later British newspapers published stories about Crabb's disappearance in an underwater mission. The incident caused a major diplomatic row, with the Russians accusing British Intelligence of a bungled attempt to spy on their warship.

As Crabb was no longer an enlisted sailor and the Royal Navy had not been officially involved, the Admiralty had difficulty in producing any credible explanation for Crabb's disappearance. On 27 April, Inglis (as Director of Naval Intelligence), instructed the Admiralty to announce that Crabb had been specially employed in connection with trials of certain underwater apparatus; he had not returned from a test dive in Stokes Bay and must be presumed drowned. This explanation was clearly not in accordance with the known facts and the British prime minister Anthony Eden was challenged on the matter in Parliament on 14 May; Eden released a statement that

It would not be in the public interest to disclose the circumstances in which Commander Crabb is presumed to have met his death. I think it necessary, in the special circumstances of this case, to make it clear that what was done was done without the authority or the knowledge of Her Majesty's Ministers. Appropriate disciplinary steps are being taken.

On 21 June, Inglis issued a memo explaining that the Royal Navy "considered it essential" to avoid implicating top officers in Portsmouth; in a "bona fide" operation, there would have been "immediate and extensive rescue operations" but these were not possible because "a search could not be carried out beside the Russian warships". Inglis pointed out that, instead, "the moment it became clear that a mishap had occurred (name blanked out) was ordered to return to his ship and take no further part in the affair". The memo mentions "discussions in Admiralty in search of a convincing cover story", and expresses concern that, if the unidentified serviceman had to testify in any legal proceedings, it would involve "further risk of compromise of the true nature of the operation".

Some of the Government papers relating to this incident were released in October 2006, fifty years later. These reveal that blame for the embarrassing intelligence failure fell on Inglis, as the director of naval intelligence. Inglis was censured, but he kept his job, and the two permanent secretaries were told they were guilty of an error of judgment in not informing ministers. Many of the Government documents regarding Crabb's disappearance are not scheduled to be released until 2057.

== Honours ==
Inglis was appointed Officer of the Order of the British Empire in the 1943 New Year Honours, and Companion of the Order of the Bath (CB) in January 1957. Shortly before his retirement, he became a knight on promotion to Knight Commander of the Order of the British Empire (KBE) in the 1959 Queen's Birthday Honours.

Military offices
Preceded by Sir Anthony Buzzard	Director of Naval Intelligence; 1954–1960	Succeeded by Sir Norman Denning
