= Hubert Ashton =

English cricketer, footballer, and politician

Sir Hubert Ashton KBE MC
- Ashton in May 1959.

Member of Parliament for Chelmsford
- In office 23 February 1950 – 25 September 1964
- Preceded by: Ernest Millington
- Succeeded by: Norman St John-Stevas

Personal details
- Born: Hubert Ashton; 13 February 1898 Calcutta, Bengal
- Died: 17 June 1979 (aged 81) Wealdside, Essex, England
- Party: Conservative
- Spouse: Dorothy Gaitskell (m. 1927)
- Cricket career

Cricket information
- Batting: Right-handed

International information
- National sides: India; Burma

Domestic team information
- Years: Team
- 1920–1922: Cambridge University
- 1921–1939: Essex
- 1927: Marylebone Cricket Club

Career statistics
Competition	First-class
Matches	71
Runs scored	4,025
Batting average	38.70
100s/50s	8/21
Top score	236*
Catches/stumpings	71/–
- Source: CricketArchive, 14 October 2011

Sir Hubert Ashton KBE MC (13 February 1898 – 17 June 1979) was an English first-class cricketer, footballer and politician.

== Biography ==
=== Early life ===
Ashton was born in Calcutta, India on 13 February 1898. Ashton's mother, Victoria Alexandrina Inglis, was the daughter of Sir John Eardley Wilmot Inglis, who commanded the British forces at the Siege of Lucknow, and Julia Selina Thesiger.

Ashton was educated at Winchester College; on leaving Winchester in 1917 he joined the Royal Field Artillery as an officer and served for the rest of World War I. He was awarded the Military Cross, the citation for which appeared in The London Gazette in January 1919, and reads as follows:

For conspicuous gallantry and skill in leading a section of guns into a forward position near Trones Wood on 27th August, 1918, where, under heavy shell and machine-gun fire, he succeeded in destroying an enemy strong point, thereby greatly facilitating the infantry advance.

After the war, which ended due to the armistice with Germany on 11 November 1918, he went up to Trinity College, Cambridge.

=== Cricket career ===
As a cricketer, Ashton was a sound right-hand batsman in the outstanding Cambridge University sides in the years just after the First World War, in which he had been commissioned in the Royal Field Artillery and won the Military Cross, and he played for Essex in the vacations. In both 1921 and 1922 he scored more than 1,000 runs and at the end of the 1922 season, after just three years in first-class cricket, Ashton was averaging more than 46 runs per innings. His most famous exploit, though, was as a member of the amateur side assembled by Archie MacLaren to take on the hitherto-invincible 1921 Australian cricket team at Eastbourne. Bowled out for just 43 runs in the first innings, the so-called "England XI" were, at 60 for four wickets in their second innings, still 71 behind when Ashton was joined by Aubrey Faulkner. Ashton hit 75 in 72 minutes, Faulkner made 153 and McLaren's side won the match by 28 runs. Ashton was named as a Wisden Cricketer of the Year in 1922 largely on account of this innings. Ashton was involved in an extraordinary incident during the match against Lancashire. He was bowled, but both bails went up in the air and then returned to their grooves on top of the stumps, meaning that he was not out.

Ashton's three brothers, Gilbert, Percy and Claude, also played first-class cricket; Gilbert, Hubert and Claude captained Cambridge University in the three consecutive seasons from 1921 to 1923.

At the end of the 1922 cricket season Ashton joined the Burmah Oil Company, and his appearances thereafter were sporadic. He played for India and for Burma against the Marylebone Cricket Club (MCC) side led by Arthur Gilligan that toured India in 1926–27; he reappeared for several Essex matches in 1927; and there were a handful of first-class games across the 1930s, the last in 1939.

=== Football career ===
Ashton was also an accomplished footballer, playing as an amateur for all his footballing career, which began with the Corinthians and then, during the 1919–20 season, West Bromwich Albion. He made his only appearance in the Football League in May 1925 for Bristol Rovers against Reading. He joined Clapton Orient in August 1926, making five appearances for them during the 1926–27 season, and then joined Gillingham in May 1927 but shortly afterwards retired from football to focus on his cricketing career.

=== Post-cricket and political career ===
Ashton later pursued a different career, first in cricket administration, as president of Essex from 1941, and then in national UK politics. He served as High Sheriff of Essex in 1943 and was then elected as Conservative Member of Parliament for Chelmsford at the 1950 general elections and held the seat at three further UK general elections, before retiring in 1964. In 1953, he and Edgar Stanbury Dobell produced Sporting Fanfare, a light programme for the BBC. In the 1959 Birthday Honours, Ashton was appointed a Knight Commander of the Order of the British Empire (KBE) for political and public services, and it was as Sir Hubert Ashton that he became MCC president in 1960–61. Ashton died in South Weald, Essex on 17 June 1979.

=== Personal life ===
In 1927 Ashton married Dorothy Gaitskell, sister of Hugh Gaitskell. They had two sons and two daughters.

Honorary titles
Preceded by Colonel Richard Parker	High Sheriff of Essex; 1943	Succeeded by Wing-Commander Denis Buxton
Parliament of the United Kingdom
Preceded by Ernest Millington	Member of Parliament for Chelmsford; 1950–1964	Succeeded by Norman St John-Stevas
Church of England titles
Preceded by Sir John Crowder	Second Church Estates Commissioner; 1957–1962	Succeeded by Sir John Arbuthnot
Preceded by Sir James Brown	Third Church Estates Commissioner; 1962–1972	Succeeded by Dame Betty Ridley
