= Frederic Thesiger, 1st Baron Chelmsford =

British politician (1794–1878)

The Right Honourable The Lord Chelmsford PC FRS
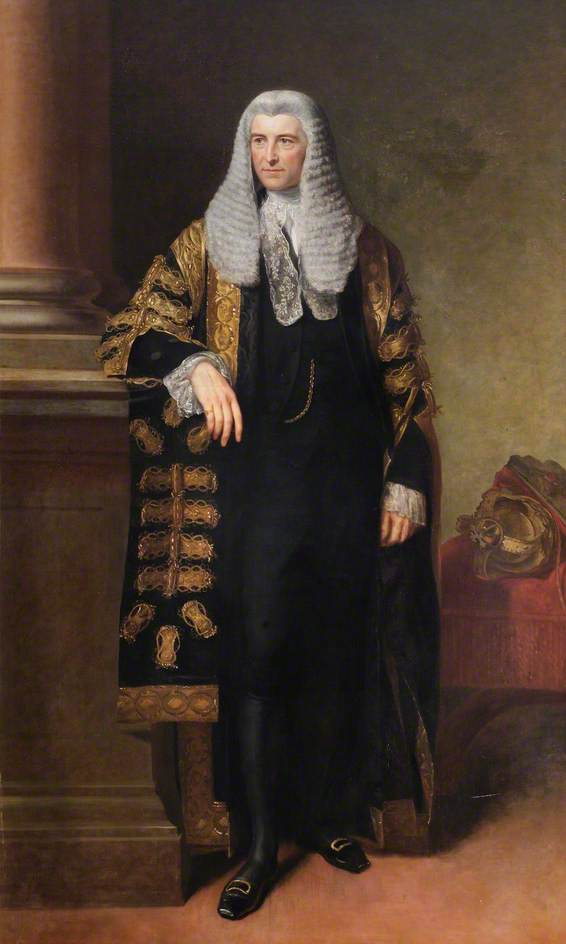

Lord Chancellor
- In office 26 February 1858 – 11 June 1859
- Monarch: Victoria
- Prime Minister: The Earl of Derby
- Preceded by: The Lord Cranworth
- Succeeded by: The Lord Campbell
- In office 6 July 1866 – 29 February 1868
- Monarch: Victoria
- Prime Minister: The Earl of Derby
- Preceded by: The Lord Cranworth
- Succeeded by: The Lord Cairns

Personal details
- Born: 25 April 1794 London, United Kingdom
- Died: 5 October 1878 (aged 84) London, United Kingdom
- Resting place: Brompton Cemetery
- Party: Conservative
- Spouse: Anna Maria Tinling (m. 1822; died 1875)

Frederic Thesiger, 1st Baron Chelmsford, PC, FRS (25 April 1794 – 5 October 1878) was a British jurist and Conservative politician. He was twice Lord High Chancellor of Great Britain.

== Early life ==
Born in London, Thesiger was the third son of Charles Thesiger, collector of customs at St Vincent, West Indies, by his wife Mary Anne, daughter of Theophilus Williams. His paternal grandfather, John Andrew Thesiger, was born in Saxony but migrated to England and became secretary to Lord Rockingham. Thesiger's uncle Sir Frederick Thesiger was naval aide-de-camp to Lord Nelson at the Battle of Copenhagen in 1801.

== Career ==
Thesiger was originally destined for a naval career, and he served as a midshipman on HMS Cambrian in 1807 at the second bombardment of Copenhagen. His only surviving brother died about this time, however, and he became entitled to succeed to a valuable estate in the West Indies. It was decided that he should leave the navy and study law with a view to practising in the West Indies and eventually managing his property in person. He proceeded to enter at Gray's Inn in 1813, and was called to the bar on 18 November 1818. He joined the home circuit, and soon got into good practice at the Surrey sessions, while he also made a fortunate purchase in buying the right to appear in the old palace court (see Lord Steward). Another change of fortune, however, awaited him, for a volcano destroyed the family estate, and he was thrown back upon his prospect of a legal practice in the West Indies.

In 1824, he distinguished himself by his defence of Joseph Hunt when on his trial at Hertford with John Thurtell for the murder of William Weare; and eight years later at Chelmsford assizes he won a hard-fought action in an ejectment case after three trials, to which he attributed so much of his subsequent success that when he was raised to the peerage he elected to be created Baron Chelmsford, of Chelmsford in the County of Essex. In 1834, he was made King's Counsel, and in 1835 was briefed in the Dublin election inquiry which unseated Daniel O'Connell. In 1840, he was elected member of parliament for Woodstock. In 1844, he became Solicitor General, but having ceased to enjoy the favour of the Duke of Marlborough, lost his seat for Woodstock and had to find another at Abingdon. In 1845, he became Attorney-General, holding the post until the fall of the Peel government on 3 July 1846. Thus by three days Thesiger missed being chief justice of the common pleas, for on 6 July Sir Nicholas Tindal died, and the seat on the bench, which would have been Thesiger's as of right, fell to the Liberal attorney-general, Sir Thomas Wilde.

Thesiger remained in parliament, changing his seat, however, again in 1852, and becoming member for Stamford. During this period he enjoyed a very large practice at the bar, being instructed in many causes célèbres including the Swynfen will case and Cardinal Newman's criminal prosecution for his libel of Giacinto Achilli. On Lord Derby coming into office for the second time in 1858, Thesiger was raised straight from the bar to the Lord Chancellorship (as were Brougham and Vaux, Selborne and Halsbury). He served as Lord Chancellor again in Derby's 1866–67 government. In 1868. Lord Derby retired, and his successor, Benjamin Disraeli, wanted Lord Cairns as Lord Chancellor. Lord Chelmsford was very sore at his supersession and the manner of it, but according to Lord Malmesbury he retired under a compact made before he took office.

== Family ==
Lord Chelmsford married Anna Maria Tinling, daughter of William Tinling and Frances Pierson, in 1822. They had four sons and three daughters. His eldest son, Frederic, who succeeded to his peerage, earned distinction as a soldier, commanding at the disastrous defeat at Isandlwana, but recovering some of his reputation by his victory at Ulundi. Chelmsford's second son Charles Wemyss Thesiger (1831–1903), was a Lieutenant-General in the Army. Chelmsford's third son, Alfred Henry Thesiger, was a Lord Justice of Appeal, but died aged 42. Lady Chelmsford died in April 1875, aged 75. Lord Chelmsford survived her by three years and died in London on 5 October 1878, aged 84. He is buried in Brompton Cemetery in London. His daughter, Julia (1833–1904) was married to Sir John Eardley Inglis who commanded the British forces during the Siege of Lucknow in 1857. She later wrote of her experiences during the siege including extracts from her diary.

== Arms ==
Coat of arms of Frederic Thesiger, 1st Baron Chelmsford
Crest A cornucopia fesswise the horn Or the fruit Proper thereon a dove holding in the beak a sprig of laurel also Proper. Escutcheon Gules a griffin segreant Or within an orle of roses Argent barbed and seeded Proper. Supporters On either side a griffin Or winged Vair Motto Spes Et Fortuna (Hope and Fortune)

== Notes ==
Parliament of the United Kingdom
Preceded by Marquess of Blandford	Member of Parliament for Woodstock; 1840–1844	Succeeded by Marquess of Blandford
Preceded by Thomas Duffield	Member of Parliament for Abingdon; 1844–1852	Succeeded by James Caulfeild
Preceded by Marquess of Granby; John Charles Herries	Member of Parliament for Stamford; 1852–1858; With: John Charles Herries to 1853; Lord Robert Cecil from 1853	Succeeded by John Inglis; Lord Robert Cecil
Legal offices
Preceded by Sir William Webb Follett	Solicitor General; 1844–1845	Succeeded by Sir Fitzroy Kelly
Preceded by Sir William Webb Follett	Attorney General; 1845–1846	Succeeded by Sir Thomas Wilde
Preceded by Sir Alexander Cockburn	Attorney General; 1852	Succeeded by Sir Alexander Cockburn, Bt
Political offices
Preceded by The Lord Cranworth	Lord High Chancellor of Great Britain; 1858–1859	Succeeded by The Lord Campbell
Preceded by The Lord Cranworth	Lord High Chancellor of Great Britain; 1866–1868	Succeeded by The Lord Cairns
Peerage of the United Kingdom
New creation	Baron Chelmsford; 1858–1878	Succeeded by Frederic Thesiger
