= Pigeon Island National Park =

National park in Sri Lanka

- IUCN category II (national park)
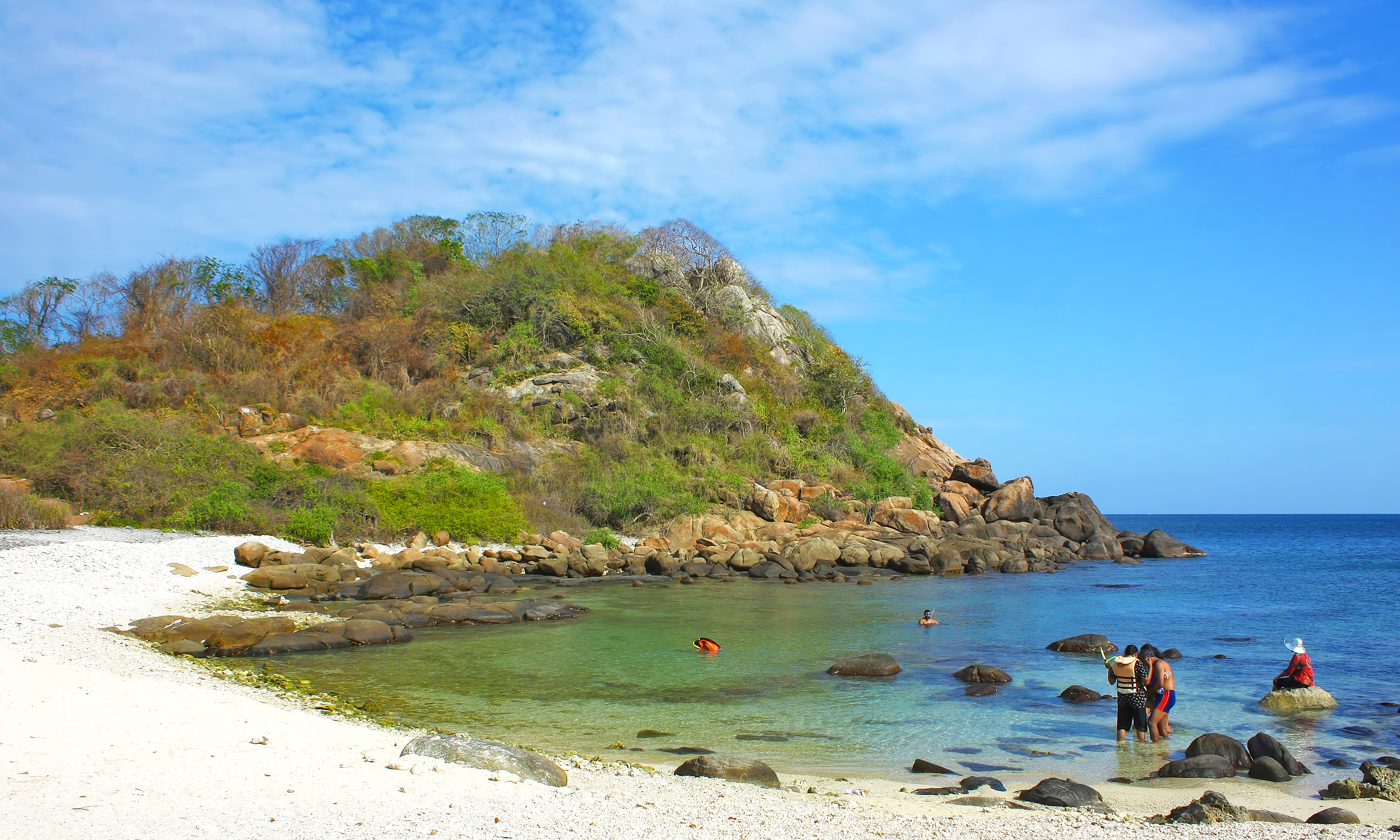
- Pigeon Island

- Location within Sri Lanka
- Location: Eastern Province, Sri Lanka
- Nearest city: Trincomalee
- Coordinates: 8°43′N 81°12′E
- Area: 471.4 hectares (1.820 mi^{2})
- Established: 2003
- Governing body: Department of Wildlife Conservation

Pigeon Island National Park is one of the three marine national parks of Sri Lanka. The national park is situated 1 km off the coast of Nilaveli, a coastal town in Eastern Province, encompassing a total area of 471.429 hectares. The island's name derives from the rock pigeon which has colonized it. The national park contains some of the best remaining coral reefs of Sri Lanka. Pigeon Island was designated as a sanctuary in 1963. In 2003 it was re-designated as a national park, making it the 17th such park in Sri Lanka. The island was used as a shooting range during the colonial era. Pigeon Island was one of the several protected areas affected by the Indian Ocean tsunami in 2004.

== Physical features ==
Pigeon Island consists of two islands; large pigeon island and small pigeon island. The large pigeon island is fringed by a coral reef, and is about 200 m long and 100 m wide. Its highest point is 44.8 m above mean sea level. The small pigeon island is surrounded by rocky islets. The national park is situated within the dry zone of Sri Lanka. The mean annual temperature is around 27.0 °C (80.6 °F). The annual rainfall ranges between 1,000–1,700 millimetres (39–67 in) while most of the rain is received during the North-eastern monsoon season from October to March.

== Flora and fauna ==
The large pigeon island's coral reef fauna is dominated by Acropora spp. with some Montipora spp. Faviidae, Mussidae and Poritidae species dominate the coral reef around the rocky islets. Areas with soft corals such as Sinularia, Lobophyton, and Sarcophyton can also be observed. The coral reef harbors many vertebrates and invertebrates. Many of the 100 species of corals and 300 coral reef fishes recorded around the Trincomalee area are found in the national park. Juvenile and adult blacktip reef shark are seen around the shallow coral areas. Hawksbill turtle, green turtle and olive ridley are the visiting sea turtles of the coral reef. The island is important breeding ground for the rock pigeon.

== Conservation ==
Fishing and ornamental fish collection are the main economic usages of the coral reef. The pigeon island is also used as a scuba diving site. Uncontrolled tourism has resulted in reef degradation and loss of biodiversity and fish density. Scientific research was hindered due to the civil war in the past two decades. A proposed pier between the mainland coast and the island has attracted criticism.

== See also ==
- Protected areas of Sri Lanka
