= John Eardley Inglis =

British army officer (1814–1862)

Major-General Sir John Eardley Inglis KCB
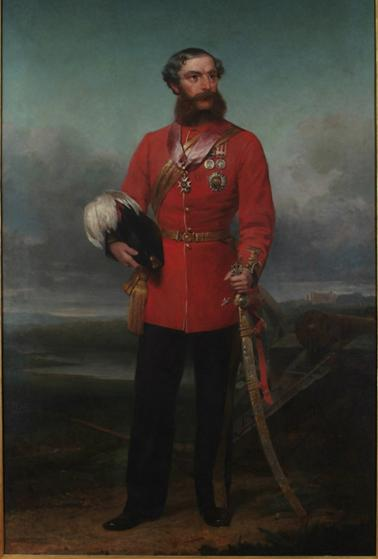
- Inglis with sword from Nova Scotia House of Assembly by William Gush, Province House (Nova Scotia) (sword is displayed at University of King's College Library, Halifax)
- Born: John Eardley Wilmot Inglis; 15 November 1814; Province of Nova Scotia
- Died: 27 September 1862 (aged 47); Homburg, Landgraviate of Hesse-Homburg

Major-General Sir John Eardley Wilmot Inglis KCB (15 November 1814 – 27 September 1862) was a British Army officer, best known for his role in protecting the British compound for 87 days in the siege of Lucknow.

== Military career ==
In 1833 he joined the 32nd (Cornwall) Regiment of Foot, in which all his regimental service was passed. In 1837 he saw active service in Canada in the Lower Canada Rebellion, including the actions at Saint-Denis and Saint-Eustache.

During the Second Anglo-Sikh War, in 1848 to 1849 in the Punjab, he was in command at the Siege of Multan and at the Battle of Gujrat.

In 1857, on the outbreak of the Indian Mutiny, he was in command of his regiment at Lucknow. Sir Henry Lawrence being mortally wounded during the siege of the residency, Inglis took command of the garrison, and maintained a successful defence for 87 days against an overwhelming force. He was promoted to major-general and made K.C.B.

After further active service in India, he was, in 1860, given command of the British troops in the Ionian Islands. In 1860 he was given the colonelcy of his regiment, now the 32nd (Cornwall) Regiment of Foot (Light Infantry), a position he held until his death.

He died at Homburg on 27 September 1862, aged 47 and was buried in the crypt of Saint Paul's Cathedral, London.

== Family ==
He was born in Nova Scotia, the son of John Inglis, the third bishop of that colony and grandson of Charles Inglis (bishop).

He was married to Julia Selina Thesiger, daughter of Frederic Thesiger, who wrote of her experiences during the siege of Lucknow including extracts from her diary.

Their children included Rupert Edward Inglis who was an England rugby international, who was killed at the Battle of the Somme in 1916. His letters home to his wife from the front were published by his widow after the war.

== Legacy ==
Inglis is the namesake of Inglis Street, Halifax, Nova Scotia, which connects with Lucknow Street, as well as Inglis County in the Australian state of New South Wales; however, the NSW county system is largely defunct.

== Gallery ==
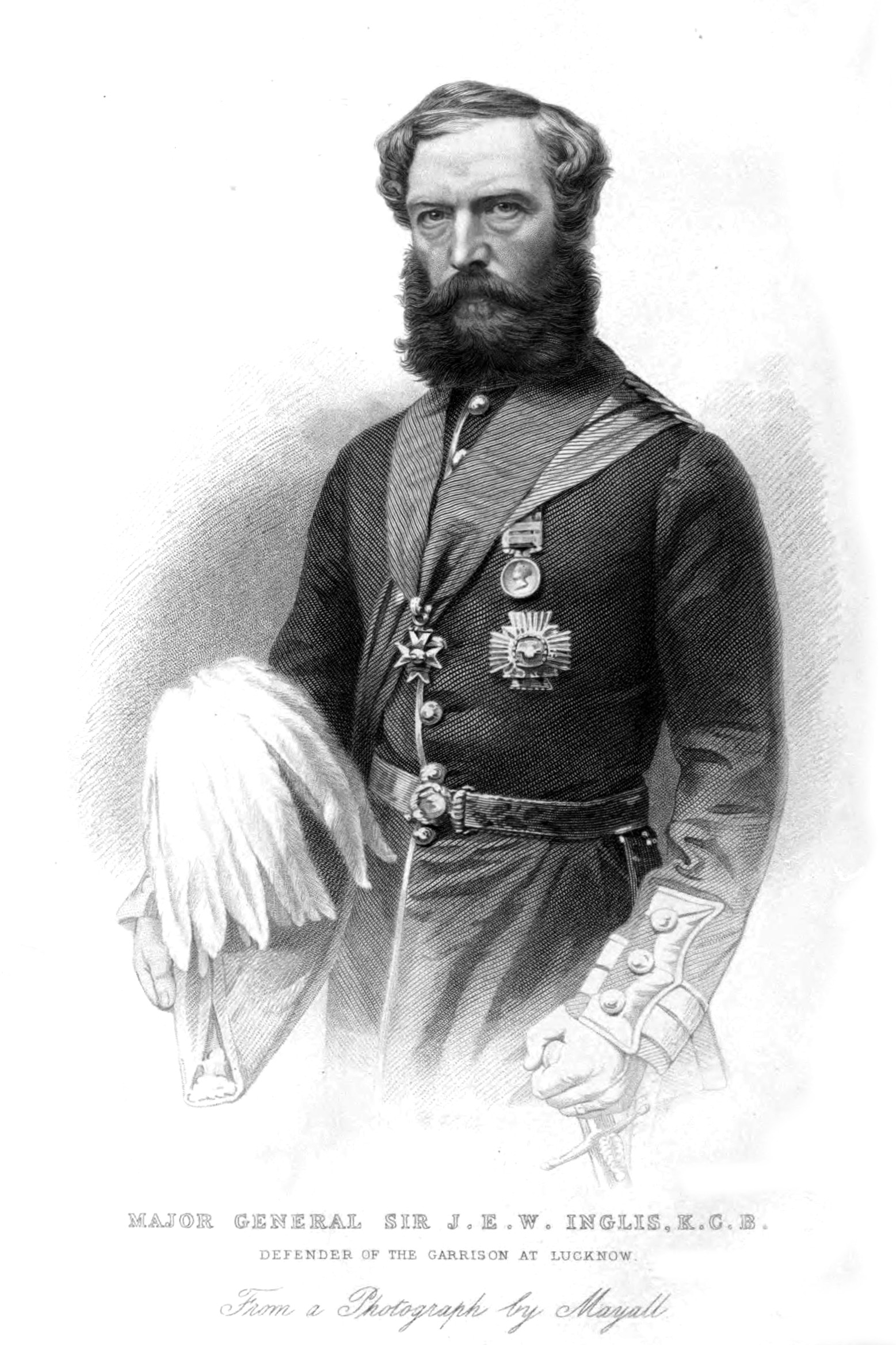
Sir John Inglis

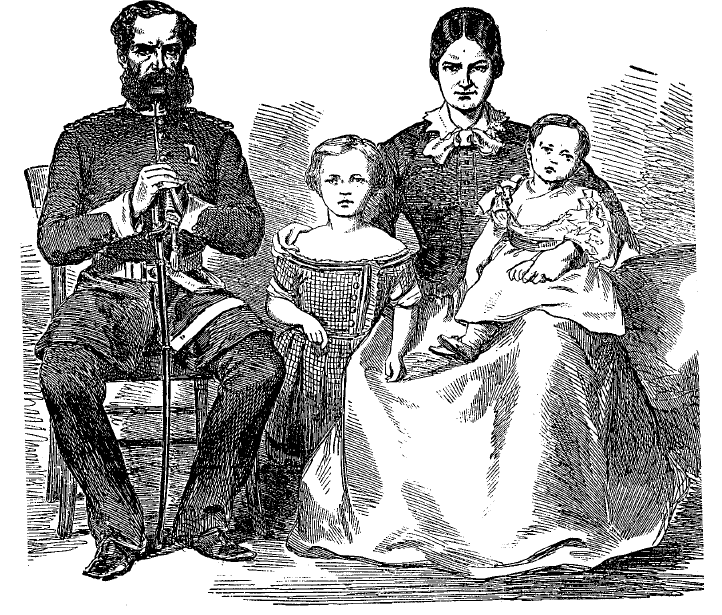
Sir John Inglis, Julia, Lady Inglis and two of their three children. Source: Illustrated London News, 28 November 1857

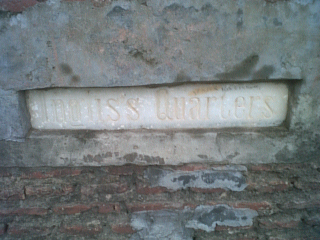
Inglis's Quarters, Residency – February 2014

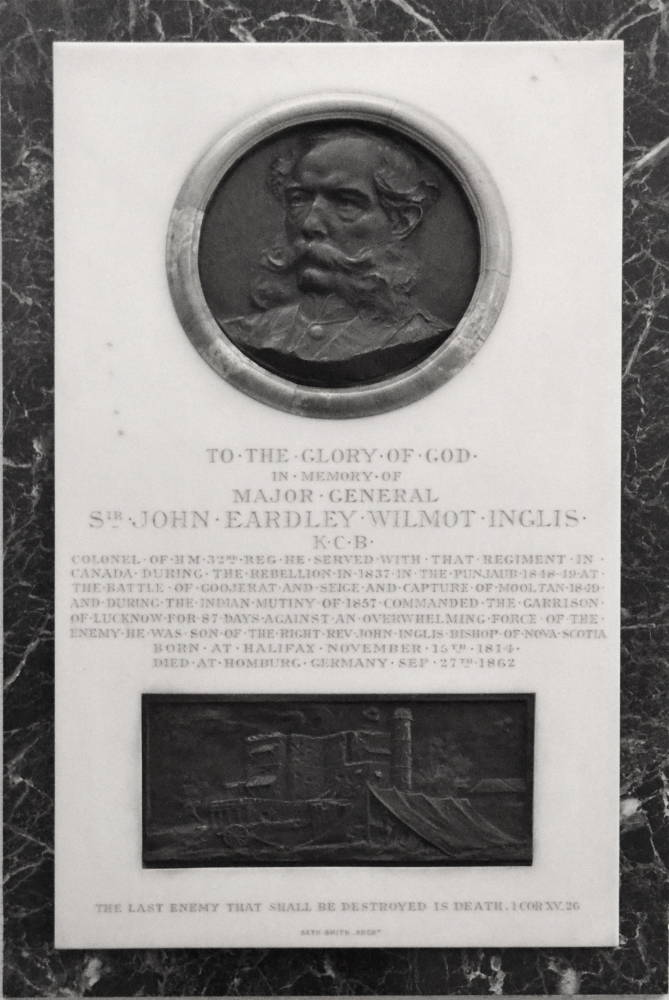
Sir John Inglis, crypt, St Paul's Cathedral, London

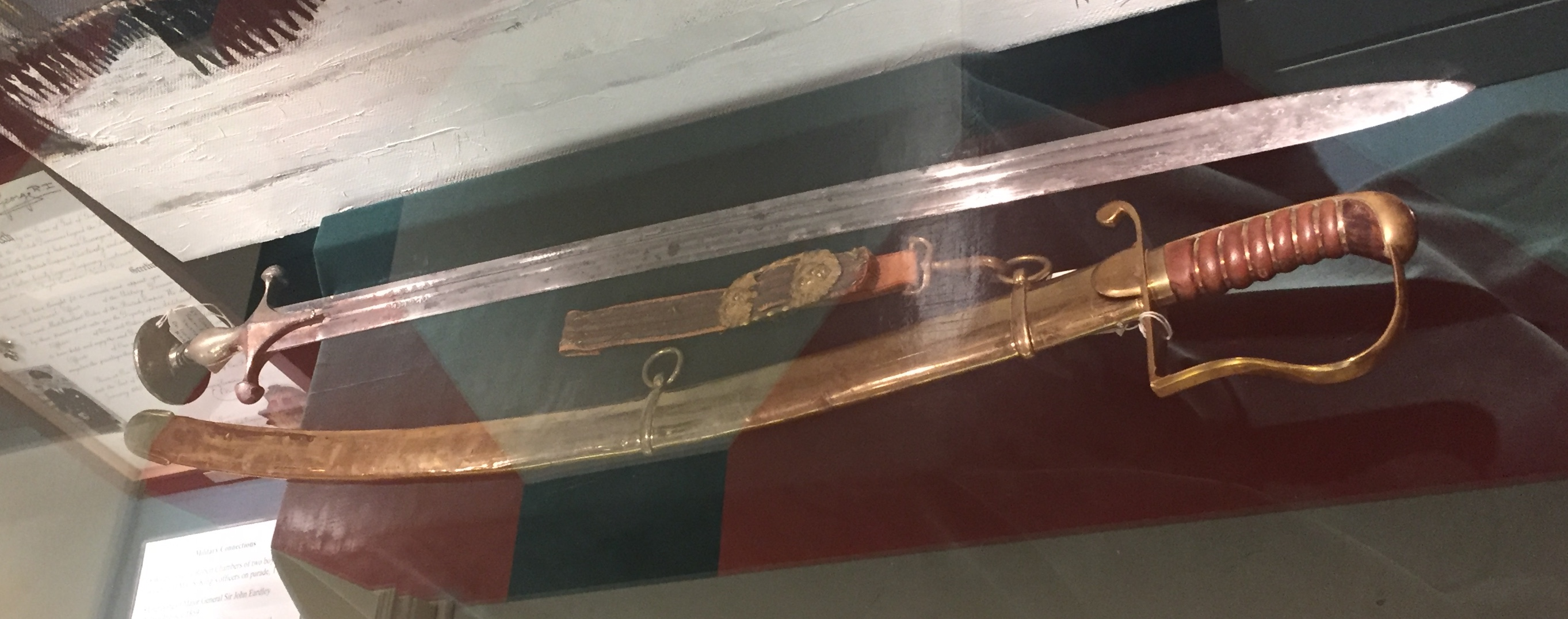
John Eardley Inglis Khanda (sword) (top) Sir Fenwick Williams' sword (bottom), University of King's College, Library, Halifax, Nova Scotia

== See also ==
- Military history of Nova Scotia

Honorary titles
Preceded by Sir Willoughby Cotton	Colonel of the 32nd (The Cornwall) Regiment of Foot (Light Infantry); 1860–1862	Succeeded by Henry Dundas, 3rd Viscount Melville
