= Loch An T-Slagain =

Loch an t-Slagain
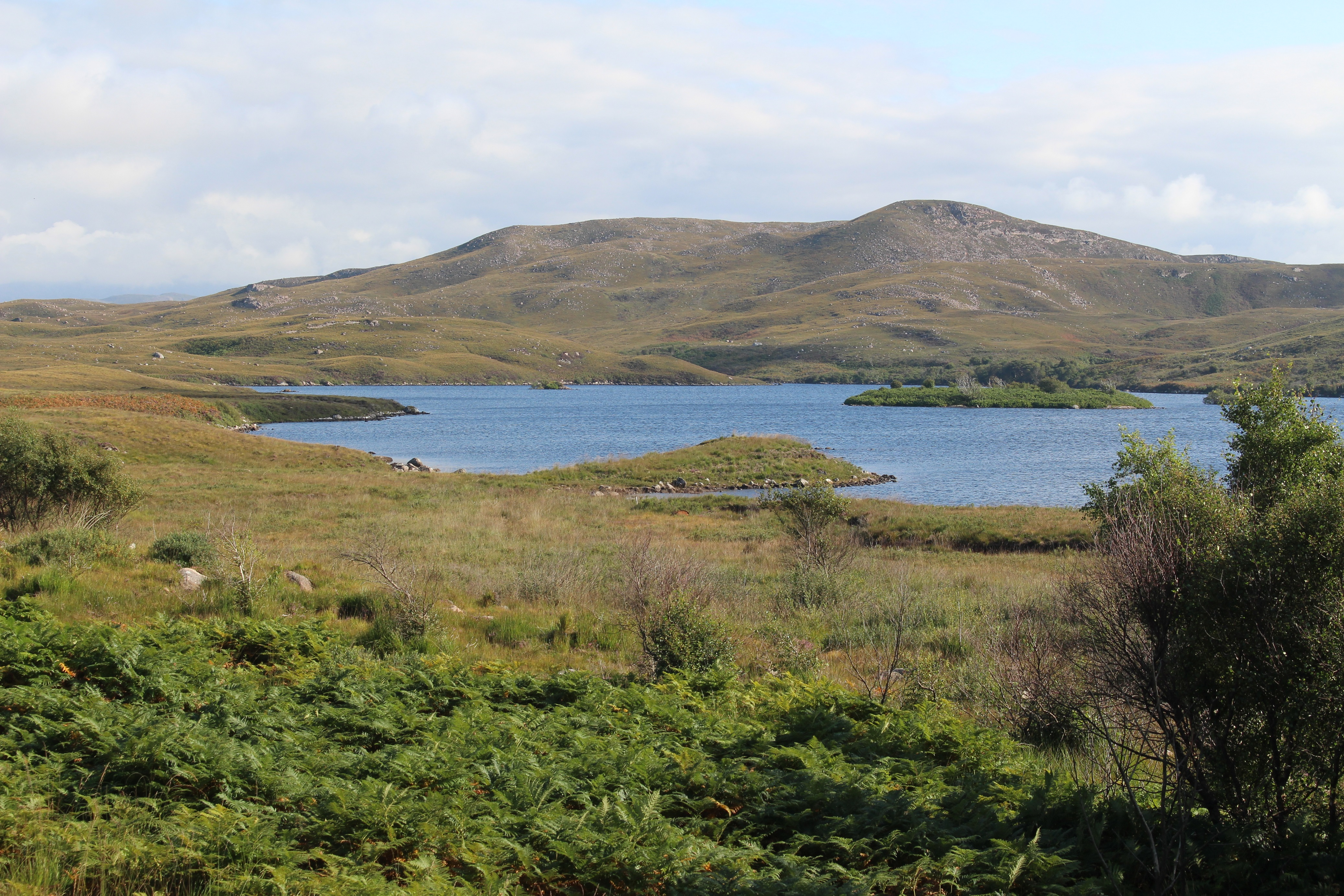
- Loch an t-Slagain from the north

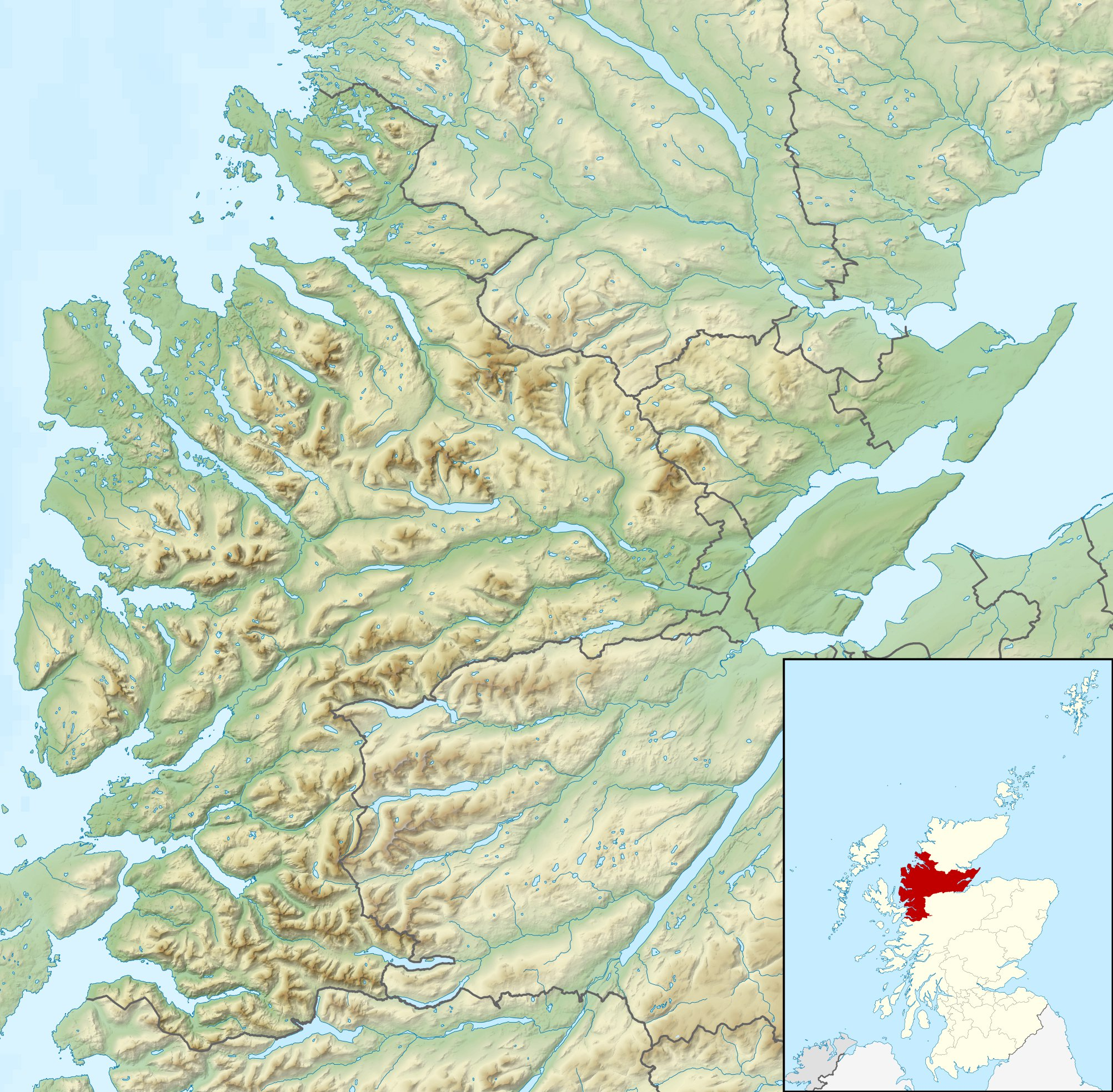
- Location in Wester Ross
- Location: NG8526094119
- Coordinates: 57.88469°N 5.62392°W
- Type: freshwater loch
- Basin countries: Scotland
- Max. length: 1 km (0.62 mi)
- Max. width: 0.55 km (0.34 mi)
- Surface area: 31 ha (77 acres)
- Average depth: 16.4 ft (5.0 m)
- Max. depth: 55.1 ft (16.8 m)
- Water volume: 54,028,261.76 ft^{3} (1,529,910.000 m^{3})
- Shore length^{1}: 3 km (1.9 mi)
- Surface elevation: 34 m (112 ft)
- Islands: 2
- ^{1} Shore length is not a well-defined measure.

Loch An T-Slagain is an extremely remote small low-lying shallow freshwater loch that lies directly east of Slaggan Bay, at the entrance to Loch Ewe, in the Rubha Mòr peninsula and is directly north of Mellon Charles in Wester Ross, Scotland. Directly east is the remote hamlet of Mellon Udrigle, the site of an ancient Pictish hut circle.

== Geography ==
Loch An T-Slagain is surrounded by a low peatland covered plain that is filled with small round hillocks and a large number of lochans and lochs.

== Gallery ==
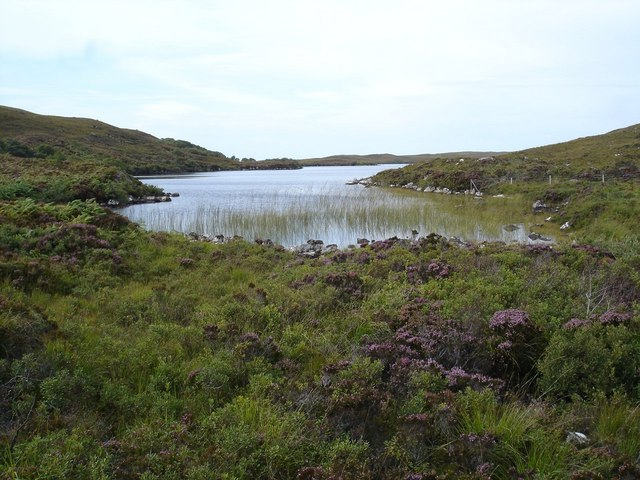
The burn from Loch an Fheoir flows into the loch here.

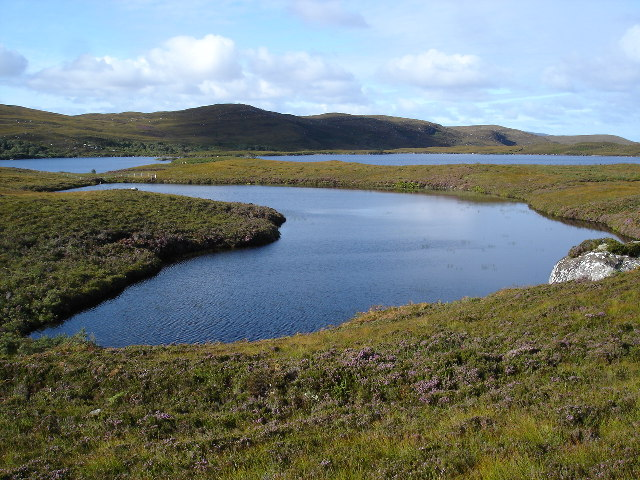
Unnamed lochan to the north-east.

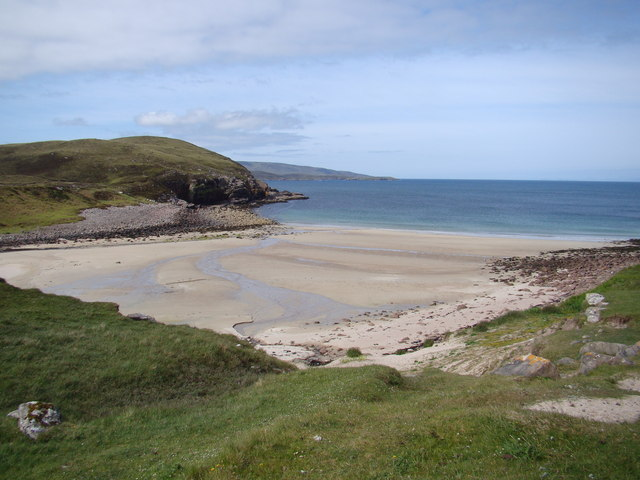
Slaggan Bay is directly west of Loch an T-Slagain.

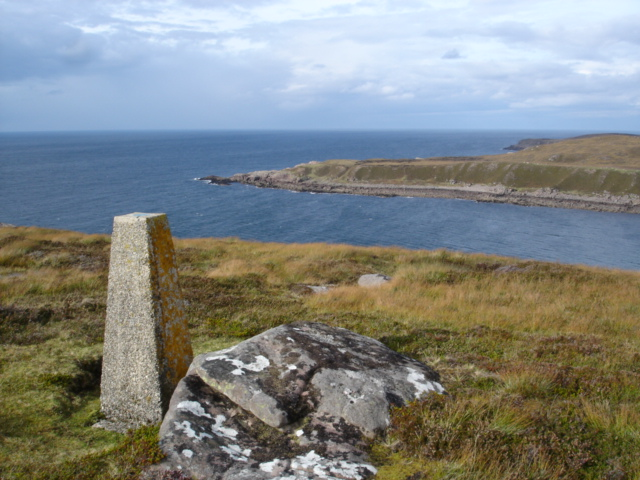
Summit of Ploc an t-Slagain, the small hillock above the loch to the south-west.

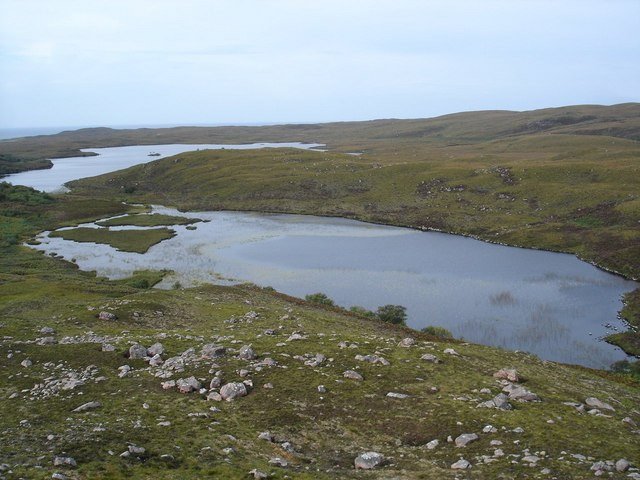
Loch an Fheoir is part of a chain of lochs, including Loch An T-Slagain, that flows into Slaggan Bay.
