= Gruinard Bay =

Embayment in the west coast of Scotland

Coordinates: 57.893°N 5.492°W

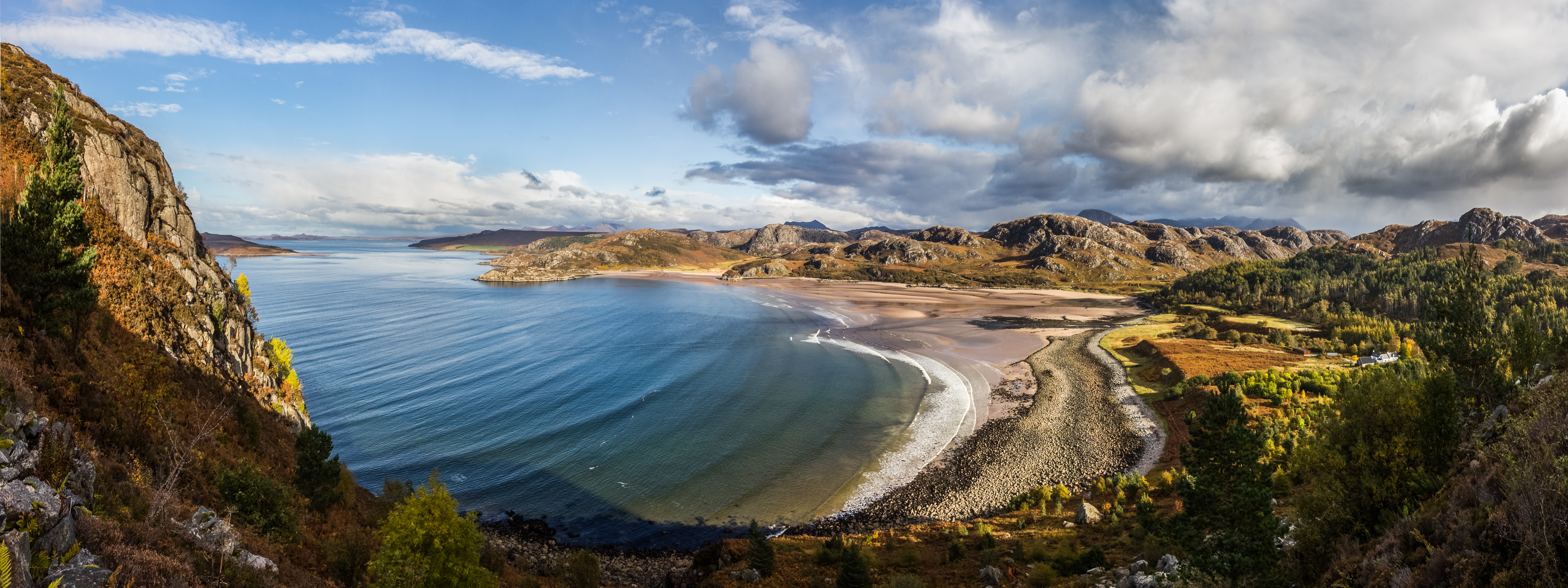
Gruinard Bay with Gruinard Island and the Summer Isles in the distance

Gruinard Bay is a large remote coastal embayment, located 12 miles north of Poolewe, in northwestern Ross and Cromarty, and is in the former parish of Lochbroom, in the west coast of Scotland.

== Settlements ==
Gruinard Bay has a number of settlements, mainly located on the eastern shore of the bay. On the southeast corner, the small hamlet of Little Gruinard is located, where the similar named river leaves land. On the south coast, the small townships of Sand, First Coast and Second Coast are situated along the A832 road. On the western coast, the former fishing village of Laide, in the nook where the coast turns north, overlooks Gruinard Island to the northeast. Further up the west coast, the villages of Achgarve, the main village of Mellon Udrigle and the smaller crofting township of Opinan have a commanding view of the bay and Gruinard island.

== Geography ==
Gruinard Bay is formed from the boundary of Loch Broom to the northeast, encompasses the opening of Little Loch Broom to the east with Static Point further south, and on the west side by the Rubha Mòr peninsula, and Loch Ewe on the southwestern boundary. The bay measures 5.5 miles along its western shore, and 4.5 miles on its eastern shore, forming a L shape.

The bay overlooks the infamous Gruinard Island, which is 0.68 miles (1 km) offshore, at the eastern side of the bay. The Summer Isles are visible to the northeast.

Three fast flowing rivers flow into the Bay. Little Gruinard river, occasionally called River Little Gruinard, flows 4 miles from the Fionn Loch to enter Bay at the settlement of Little Gruinard, and Camas Gaineamhaich beach. River Gruinard river, flows a similar distance from the two lochs, the larger to the east, Loch Sealga and the smaller Loch Ghiubhsachain to the west, into the bay at the western side of Camas Gaineamhaich beach. The smaller stream of Inverianvie river, flows from the small loch, Loch à Mhadaidh Mòr and enters the bay between the two other rivers.
