= Little Gruinard =

River in Scotland

Coordinates: 57°49′50″N 5°28′6″W

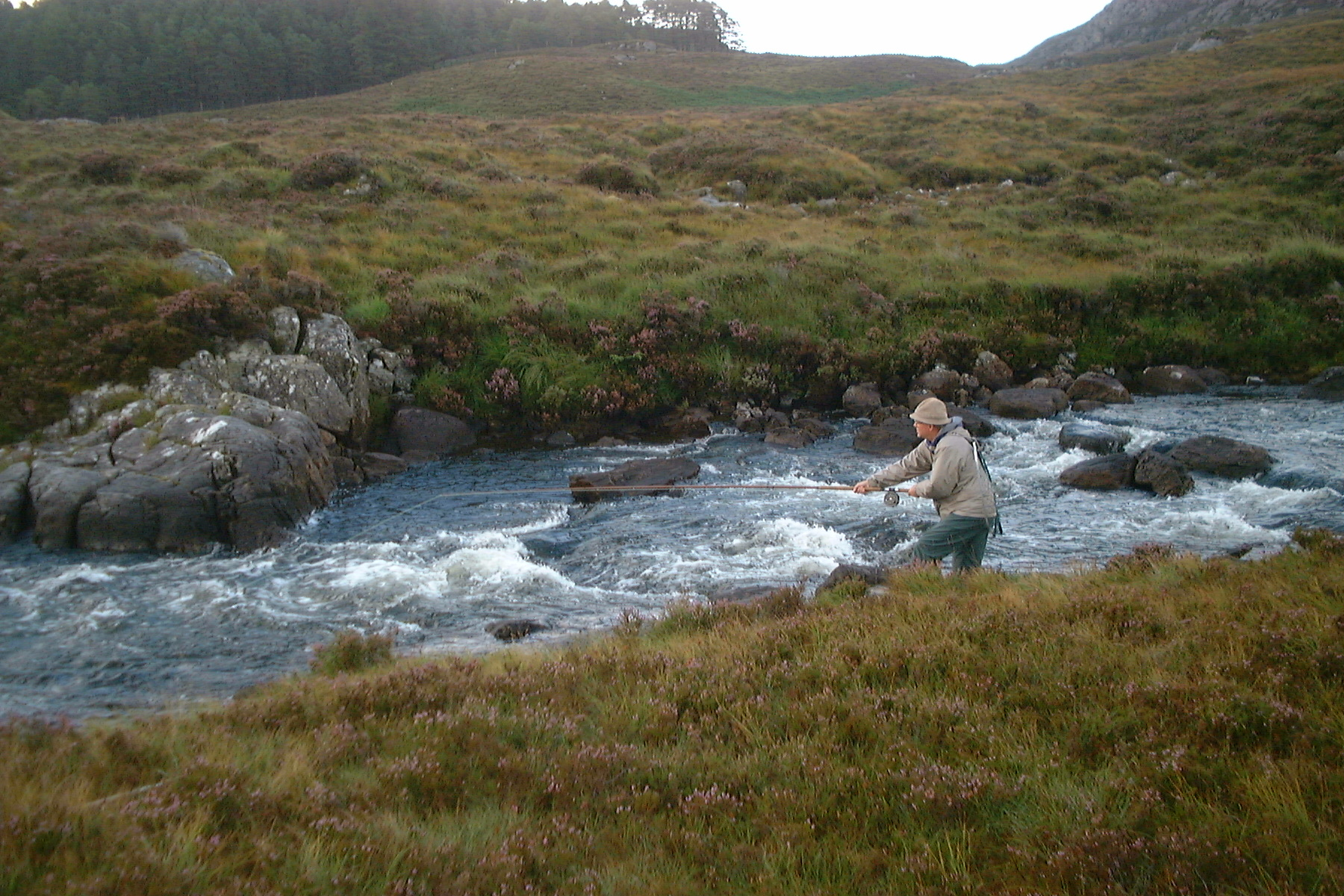
Fishing on the Little Gruinard

The Little Gruinard is a river in Wester Ross, Scotland.

The river runs from the Fionn Loch into Gruinard Bay (famed for Gruinard Island). It lies within the Letterewe Estate, previously owned by Paul Fentener van Vlissingen, a Dutch businessman. The Little Gruinard has been a forerunner in the development of catch and release fishing amongst Scottish salmon rivers.

It drains a catchment area of 81km2.

== Fish ==
The Little Gruinard River supports a high-quality Atlantic Salmon population.

== Transport ==
The A832 road crosses the river via a bridge.

== See also ==
- Rivers of the United Kingdom
- Dundonnell and Fisherfield Forest
