= Achgarve =

Coordinates: 57.88122°N 5.56412°W

Achgarve: Scottish Gaelic: An t-Achadh Garbh
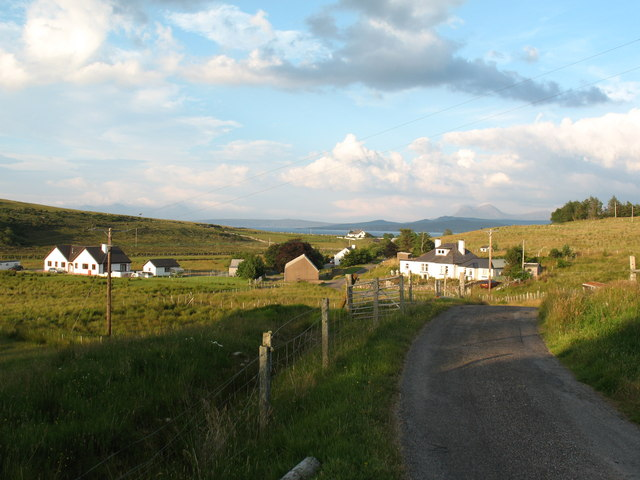
- Achgarve

- Location within the Highland council area
- OS grid reference: NG887935
- Council area: Highland
- Country: Scotland
- Sovereign state: United Kingdom
- Post town: Achnasheen
- Postcode district: IV22 2
- Police: Scotland
- Fire: Scottish
- Ambulance: Scottish
- UK Parliament: Caithness, Sutherland and Easter Ross
- Scottish Parliament: Caithness, Sutherland and Ross

Achgarve (Scottish Gaelic: An t-Achadh Garbh - the rough field) is a small coastal crofting and fishing hamlet, situated between Gruinard Bay and Loch Ewe on the Rubha Mòr peninsula, in the north west coast of Ross-shire, Scottish Highlands. An old track leads from Achgarve across the peninsula to the deserted village of Slaggan at Slaggan Bay to the west. A path also leads to Mellon Udrigle to the north of Achgarve and a coastal part connects it all the way around to Slaggan and then back to Achgarve.
