= Catch and release =

Fishing practice

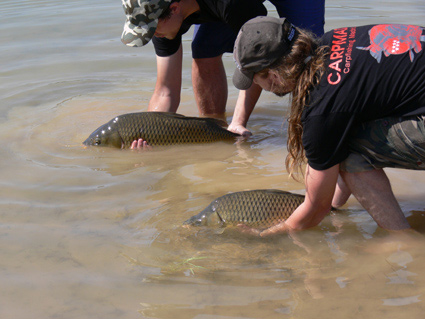
Two anglers releasing the common carp they caught

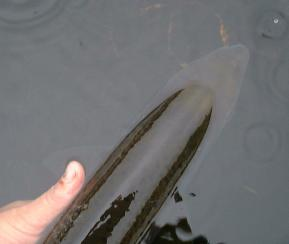
A rod-caught Atlantic salmon being released on the Little Gruinard in Wester Ross, Scotland

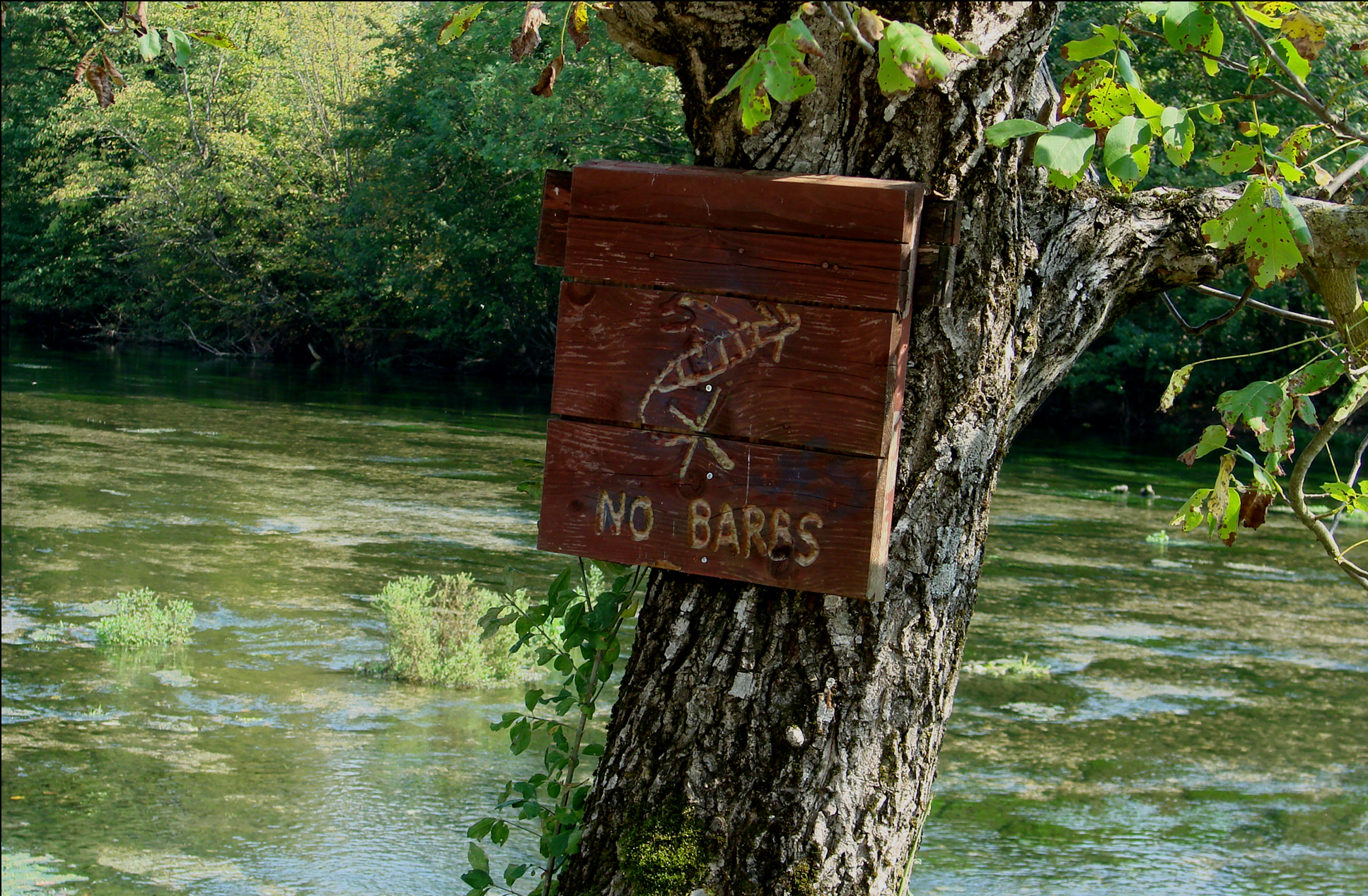
"No Barbs" sign on Ribnik River in Bosnia and Herzegovina

Catch and release is a practice within recreational fishing where after capture the fish is unhooked and returned live to the water. Originally adopted in the United Kingdom by coarse fishermen to preserve fish populations, it has since become a widely used technique to permit people to fish recreationally while ensuring sustainability in the face of growing human populations, mounting ecological pressure, increasingly effective fishing tackle and techniques, inadequate fishing regulations and enforcement, and habitat degradation.

Between 18 and 20% of fish released die from injuries and stress, although the rate varies by species. Among those that survive, their injuries may significantly reduce their ability to feed and grow. During tournaments, inadequate holding and weighing procedures may further increase mortality. With deep sea fishing in particular, fish are typically unable to adjust their physiology to the sudden pressure change. Scientific and philosophical debates over whether fish feel pain in a way similar to humans are unresolved. In the 21st century, there is a greater emphasis on developing techniques which increase the likelihood that released fish will survive, such as using barbless hooks. Catch and release is banned in Switzerland and Germany, while Canada requires barbless hooks in some cases.

== History ==
Multilingual catch and release sign in Ireland

In the United Kingdom, catch and release has been performed for more than a century by coarse fishermen in order to prevent target species from disappearing in heavily fished waters. Since the latter part of the 20th century, many salmon and sea trout rivers have been converted to complete or partial catch and release. In Scotland, the River Dee operates a full catch and release policy for salmon, grilse and sea trout.

In the United States, catch and release was first introduced as a management tool in the state of Michigan in 1952 as an effort to reduce the cost of stocking hatchery-raised trout. Anglers fishing for fun rather than for food accepted the idea of releasing the fish while fishing in "no-kill" zones. Conservationists have advocated catch and release as a way to ensure sustainability and to avoid overfishing of fish stocks. Lee Wulff, a New York-based fly angler, author and film maker, promoted catch and release as early as 1936 with the phrase "Game fish are too valuable to be caught only once." Don Martinez a West Yellowstone, Montana, fly shop owner, promoted catch and release in his 1930–40s newsletters sent to Eastern anglers.

In Australia, catch and release caught on slowly, with some pioneers practicing it in the 1960s, and the practice slowly became more widespread in the 1970s and 1980s. Catch and release is now widely used to conserve—and indeed is critical in conserving—vulnerable fish species like the large, long lived native freshwater Murray cod and the prized, slowly growing, heavily fished Australian bass, heavily fished coastal species like dusky flathead and prized gamefish like striped marlin.

In Ireland, catch and release has been used as a conservation tool for Atlantic salmon and sea trout fisheries since 2003. A number of fisheries now have mandatory catch and release regulations. Catch and release for coarse fish has been used by sport anglers for as long as these species have been fished for on this island. However catch and release for Atlantic salmon has required a huge turn about in how many anglers viewed the salmon angling resource. To encourage anglers to practice catch and release in all fisheries a number of government led incentives have been implemented.

In Canada, catch and release is mandatory for some species. Canada also requires in some cases the use of barbless hooks to facilitate release and minimize injury.

In Switzerland and Germany, catch and release fishing is considered inhumane and is now banned. In Germany, the Animal Welfare Act states that "no-one may cause an animal pain, suffering or harm without good reason". This leaves no legal basis for catch and release due to its argued inherent lack of "good reason", and thus personal fishing is solely allowed for immediate food consumption. Additionally, it is against the law to release fish back into the water if they are above minimum size requirements and are not a protected species or in closed season.

In 2011, the National Park Service in Yellowstone National Park began reversing decades of regulation that promoted catch and release and other techniques that protected fish populations. In the name of native fish conservation, they began mandatory kill regulations on rainbow and brook trout in the Lamar River drainage and encouraged unlimited taking and disposal of non-native species, including brown trout in some park waters.

== Techniques ==
Into the 21st century, there has been an emphasis on the development and refinement of science-based practices to increase the likelihood that released fish will survive (e.g., see research by Steven J. Cooke). That work led to the development of the UN FAO Technical Guidelines for Recreational Fisheries.

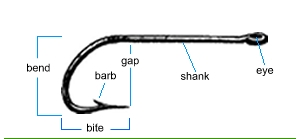
A barbed fish hook. Catch and release fishing uses barbless hooks instead, to reduce injury and handling time.

A wet fly hook with a pinched barb

Effective catch and release fishing techniques avoid excessive fish fighting and handling times by using sufficiently strong tackle and barbless hooks, avoid damage to fish skin, scale and slime layers from nets, dry hands and dry, hot or rough surfaces (that leave fish vulnerable to oomycete skin infections), and avoid damage to jaw ligaments and vertebrae by suspending fish from jaws or gills for weighing or handling. If a net must be used it is important that it is pre-wetted and is not abrasive to the fish (such as a rubber coated net or very dense lightweight mesh), because fish can easily damage themselves in a normal net while thrashing. The use of barbless hooks is an important aspect of catch and release; barbless hooks reduce injury and handling time, increasing survival. Frequently, fish caught on barbless hooks can be released without being removed from the water, and the hooks effortlessly slipped out with a single flick of the pliers or leader. Barbless hooks can be purchased from several major manufacturers or can be created from a standard hook by crushing the barb(s) flat with needle-nosed pliers. Some anglers avoid barbless hooks because of the belief that too many fish will escape. Concentrating on keeping the line tight at all times while fighting fish, equipping lures that do not have them with split rings, and using recurved point or "Triple Grip" style hooks on lures, will keep catch rates with barbless hooks as high as those achieved with barbed hooks.

One study looking at brook trout found that barbless hooks had no statistically significant effect on mortality rates when fish were hooked in the mouth, but observed that they did reduce mortalities compared to barbed hooks if fish were hooked deeper. The study also suggested bait fishing does not have a significantly higher mortality when utilized in an active style, rather than a passive manner that allows the fish to swallow the bait.

The effects of catch and release vary from species to species. A study of fish caught in shallow water on the Great Barrier Reef showed high survival rates (97%+), for released fish if handled correctly and particularly if caught on artificial baits such as lures. Fish caught on lures are usually hooked cleanly in the mouth, minimizing injury and aiding release. Other studies have shown somewhat lower survival rates for fish gut-hooked on bait if the line is cut and the fish is released without trying to remove the hook.

== Debate over pain in released fish ==
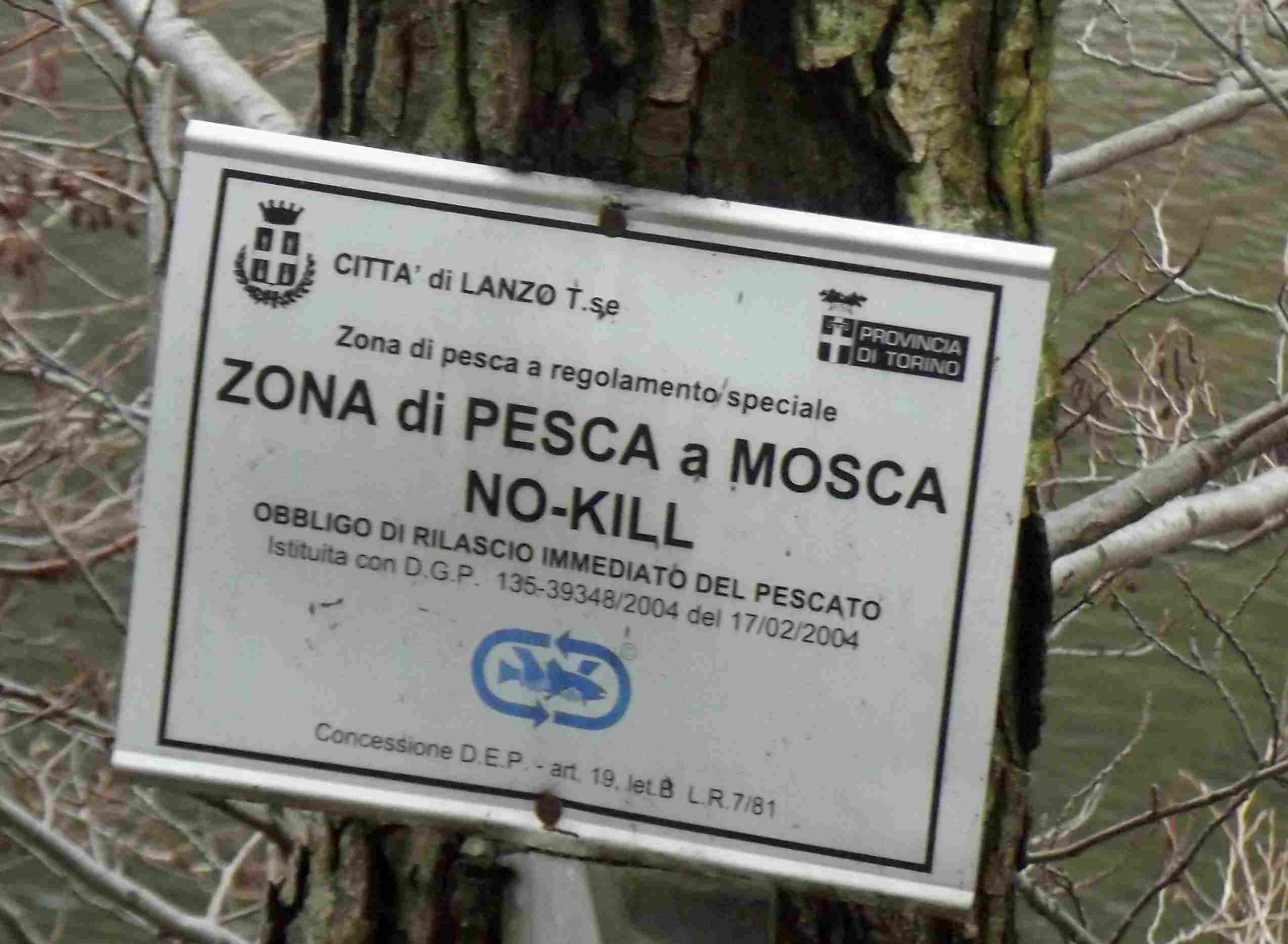
Catch and release angling area on the Stura di Lanzo in Italy

Opponents of catch and release argue that fish are highly evolved vertebrates that share many of the same neurological structures that in humans are associated with pain perception. They cite studies showing that, neurologically, fish are quite similar to higher vertebrates and that blood chemistry reveals that hormones and blood metabolites associated with stress are quite high in fish struggling against hook and line. The idea that fish do not feel pain in their mouths has been studied at the University of Edinburgh and the Roslin Institute by injecting bee venom and acetic acid into the lips of rainbow trout; the fish responded by rubbing their lips along the sides and floors of their tanks in an effort to relieve themselves of the sensation.

Lead researcher Lynne Sneddon wrote, "Our research demonstrates nociception and suggests that noxious stimulation in the rainbow trout has adverse behavioral and physiological effects. This fulfills the criteria for animal pain." A 2014 paper provides a critique of existing studies that purport to demonstrate that fish feel pain. James D. Rose of the University of Wyoming argues this may demonstrate a chemical sensitivity rather than pain and that the evidence for pain sensation in fish is ambiguous.

== Injury and mortality in released fish ==
A metastudy in 2005 found that the average catch and release mortality rate was 18%, but varied greatly by species. During an Oklahoma Department of Wildlife Conservation study, total mortality averaged 2.9% percent of fish after a six-day holding period in a livewell during spring, but in summer this increased up to 43% as a result of inadequate holding conditions and weigh in procedures during tournaments. More recent studies reported in Montana estimate that approximately 20% of released trout die from injuries or stress and for those that do not die, their injuries may significantly reduce their ability to feed and grow.

Emerging research suggests catch and release does not work very well with fish caught when deep sea fishing. Most deep sea fish species suffer from the sudden pressure change when wound to the surface from great depths; these species cannot adjust their body's physiology quickly enough to follow the pressure change. The result is called "barotrauma". Fish with barotrauma will have their enormously swollen swim-bladder protruding from their mouth, bulging eyeballs, and often sustain other, more subtle but still very serious injuries. Upon release, fish with barotrauma will be unable to swim or dive due to the swollen swim-bladder. The common practice has been to deflate the swim bladder by pricking it with a thin sharp object before attempting to release the fish. Emerging research also indicates both barotrauma and the practice of deflating the swimbladder are both highly damaging to fish, and that survival rates of caught-and-released deep-sea fish are extremely low. Barotrauma requires that fish be caught at least 10–15 m (30–50 ft) below the surface. Many surface caught fish, such as billfish, and all fish caught from shore do not meet this criterion and thus do not suffer barotrauma.

However, venting tools help reduce the effects of barotrauma and restore fish to normal function and ability. An experimental study has shown that venting improves post-release outcomes for barotrauma-affected fish. Fish exposed to barotrauma conditions via rapid decompression and subsequent venting showed 100% survival. Fish without venting had a 67 percent survival rate after decompression conditions from 30 meters and a 17 percent survival rate from 60 meters. Vented fish regained the ability to sustain an upright position more effectively than non-vented ones, allowing them to avoid a simulated predator at higher rates.

== Similar hunting practices ==
A similar practice, called "tree and free", uses hunting dogs to chase a bear or mountain lion up a tree, and then letting the predator escape. Treeing large predators in such a manner can encourage them to stay away from humans through fear.

== See also ==
- Fishing tournament
