= First Coast, Highland =

First Coast, village in Wester Ross, Scottish Highlands

Coordinates: 57.86089°N 5.503080°W

First Coast: Scottish Gaelic: An t-Eirthire Shìos
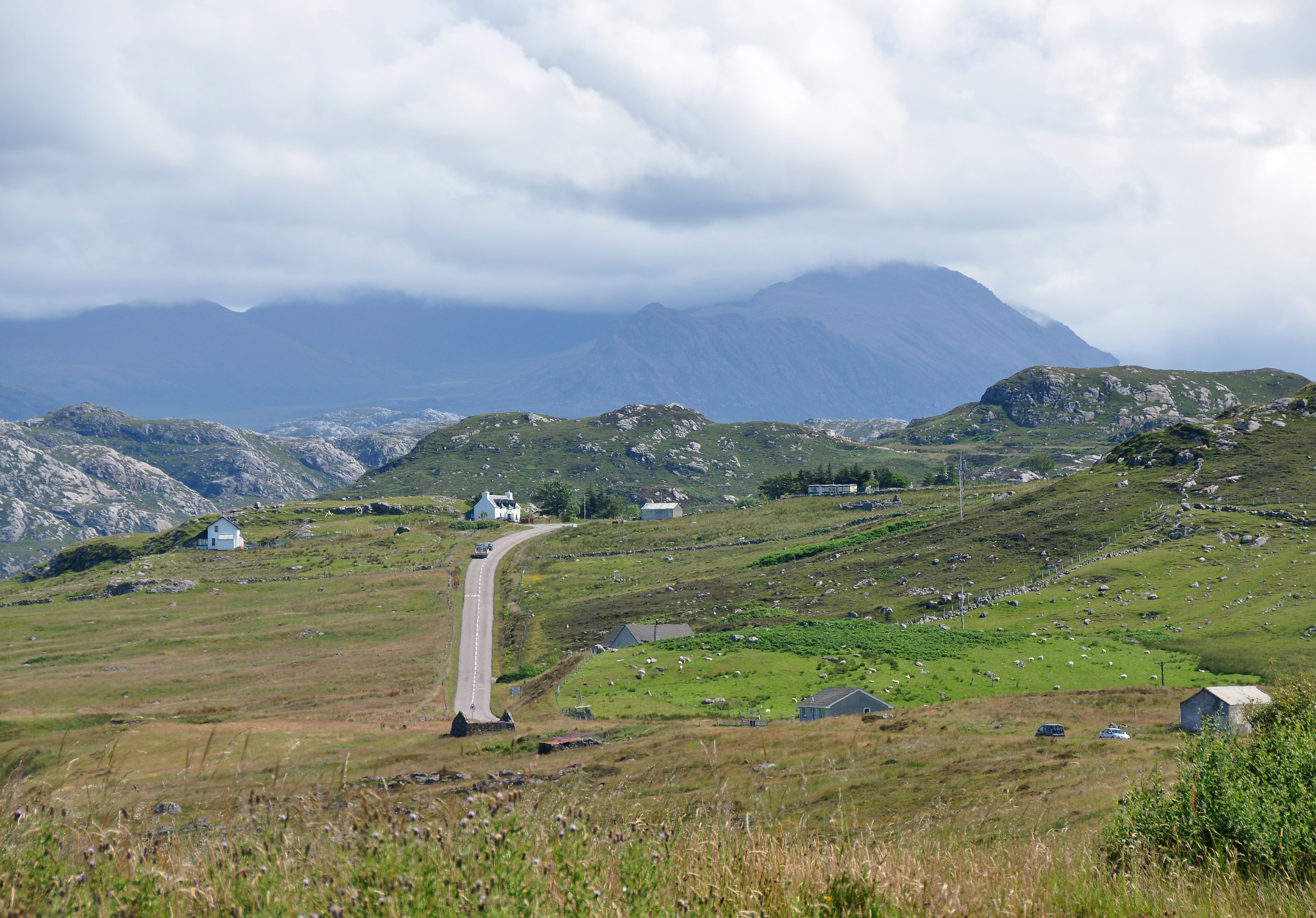
- First Coast, on the south shore of Gruinard Bay

- Location within the Ross and Cromarty area
- OS grid reference: NG9291
- Civil parish: Gairloch
- Council area: Highland
- Lieutenancy area: Ross and Cromarty
- Country: Scotland
- Sovereign state: United Kingdom
- Post town: ACHNASHEEN
- Postcode district: IV22 2NE
- Dialling code: 01445
- Police: Scotland
- Fire: Scottish
- Ambulance: Scottish
- UK Parliament: Ross, Skye and Lochaber
- Scottish Parliament: Caithness, Sutherland and Ross

First Coast is a small settlement in Wester Ross in the North West Highlands of Scotland. It is situated on the south shore of Gruinard Bay and on the A832 road, 1.5 miles (2.4 km) east of Laide and 0.6 miles (0.97 km) west of the similarly-named Second Coast.
