= SS Graigwen =

Graigwen was the name of two steamships operated by I Williams & Co, Cardiff.

- SS Graigwen (1925), torpedoed and sunk in 1940
- SS Graigwen (1943), in service 1946–58
