= Ormiscaig =

Coordinates: 57.85194°N 5.61145°W

Ormiscaig: Scottish Gaelic: Ormasgaig
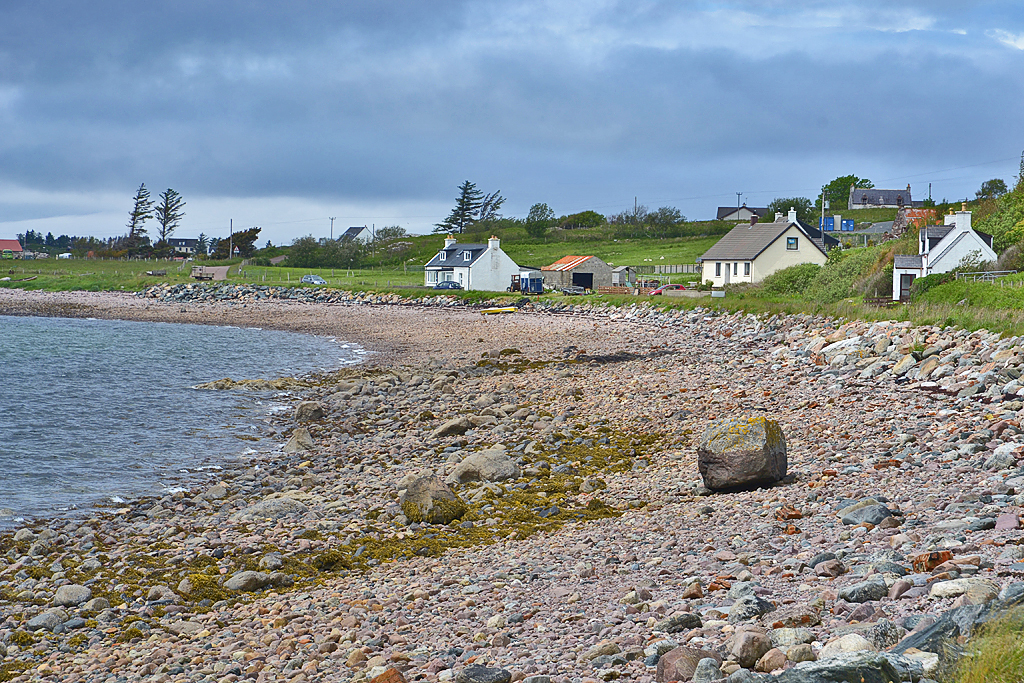

- Location within the Highland council area
- OS grid reference: NG858904
- Council area: Highland
- Country: Scotland
- Sovereign state: United Kingdom
- Postcode district: IV22 2
- Police: Scotland
- Fire: Scottish
- Ambulance: Scottish

Ormiscaig (Scottish Gaelic: Ormasgaig) is a remote crofting village on the north east shore of Loch Ewe in Achnasheen, Ross-shire, Scottish Highlands and is in the Scottish council area of Highland.

The village of Mellon Charles is less than one mile west along the coast road.
