= SS Empire Copperfield =

Cargo ship

History
- Name: Empire Copperfield (1943-46); Graigwen (1946-58); Jag Devi (1958-63)
- Owner: Ministry of War Transport (1945); Ministry of Transport (1945-46); I Williams & Co Ltd (1946-58); Great Eastern Shipping Co (1958-63)
- Operator: G Nisbet & Co Ltd (1945-46); I Williams & Co Ltd (1946-58); Great Eastern Shipping Co (1958-63)
- Port of registry: (United Kingdom) London (1945-46); (United Kingdom) Cardiff (1946-58); (India) Bombay (1958-63)
- Builder: William Pickersgill & Sons Ltd
- Launched: 16 July 1943
- Completed: September 1943
- In service: 12 October 1943
- Out of service: 19 July 1963
- Identification: Code Letters GCKV (1943-58); United Kingdom Official Number 180051 (1943-58)
- Fate: Scrapped

General characteristics
- Type: Cargo ship
- Tonnage: 6,013 GRT; 4,040 NRT
- Length: 401 ft 0 in (122.22 m)
- Beam: 56 ft 3 in (17.15 m)
- Depth: 33 ft 2 in (10.11 m)
- Installed power: Triple expansion steam engine
- Propulsion: Screw propeller

Empire Copperfield was a 6,013 GRT cargo ship that was built in 1943 by William Pickersgill & Sons Ltd, Sunderland, United Kingdom. She was built for the Ministry of War Transport (MoWT), spending much of her war service in the Mediterranean. Towards the end of the war she was serving in the Indian Ocean. In 1946 she was sold into merchant service and renamed Graigwen. A sale to India in 1958 saw her renamed Jag Devi. She served until 1963, when she was scrapped.

== Description ==
The ship was built in 1943 by William Pickersgill & Sons Ltd, Sunderland. She was launched on 16 July 1943 and completed in September.

The ship was 401 feet 0 inches (122.22 m) long, with a beam of 54 feet 0 inches (16.46 m) and a depth of 33 feet 2 inches (10.11 m). She was assessed at 6,013 GRT, 4,040 NRT.

The ship was propelled by a triple expansion steam engine, which had cylinders of 23 1/2 inches (60 cm), 38 inches (97 cm) and 66 inches (170 cm) diameter by 45 inches (110 cm) stroke. The engine was built by George Clarke (1938) Ltd, Sunderland.

== History ==
=== War service ===
1943

Empire Copperfield was built for the MoWT. She was placed under the management of G Nisbet & Co Ltd, Glasgow. The Code Letters GCKV and United Kingdom Official Number 180051 were allocated. Her maiden voyage was on 12 October 1943, from Sunderland to Methil, Fife. Empire Copperfield then joined Convoy EN 294, which departed Methil on 13 October and arrived at Loch Ewe on 15 October. She then departed from Oban, Argyll on 16 October for Liverpool, where she joined Convoy KMS 30G, which departed Liverpool on 17 October and arrived at Gibraltar on 31 October.

Empire Copperfield then joined Convoy KMS 31, which departed Gibraltar on 10 November and arrived at Port Said, Egypt on 21 November. Empire Copperfield left the convoy at Bône, Algeria. On 29 November, she departed Bône as a member of Convoy MKS 32, which had departed from Port Said on 22 November and arrived at Gibraltar on 3 December. She left the convoy on 30 November at Philippeville. On 10 December, Empire Copperfield joined Convoy UGS 24, which had departed the Hampton Roads, United States on 14 November and arrived at Port Said on 12 December. She left the convoy at Augusta, Italy, arriving on 8 December. On 12 December, Empire Copperfield departed Augusta as a member of Convoy AH 12, which arrived at Bari on 14 December. She departed Bari on 16 December and arrived at Taranto on 17 December. On 19 December, Empire Copperfield departed Taranto as a member of Convoy HA 13, which had departed Bari that day and arrived at Augusta on 21 December. She then joined Convoy GUS 25, which had departed Port Said on 16 December and arrived at Hampton Roads on 17 January 1944. Empire Copperfield left the convoy at Philippeville, where she arrived on 24 December.

1944

Empire Copperfield departed Philippeville on 4 January 1944 as a member of Convoy UGS 27, which had departed from the Hampton Roads on 15 December 1943 and arrived at Port Said on 11 January. She left the convoy at Augustsa, arriving on 7 January. Empire Copperfield then joined Convoy AH 18, which departed Augusta on 12 January and arrived at Bari on 14 January. Empire Copperfield left the convoy at Brindisi on 14 January. She then sailed to Bari, arriving that day. She then joined Convoy HA 20, which departed Bari on 18 January and arrived at Augusta on 26 January.

Empire Copperfield departed Augusta on 2 February, joining Convoy KMS 39, which had departed Gibraltar on 28 January and arrived at Port Said on 7 February. On 11 February, she departed Port Said bound for Alexandria, Egypt, arriving on 12 February. Empire Copperfield departed Alexandria on 20 February, joining Convoy MKS41, which had departed Port Said on 19 February and arrived at Gibraltar on 2 March. She left the convoy at Augusta, arriving on 25 February. She departed Augusta the next day as a member of Convoy AH 27, which arrived at Bari on 28 February. Empire Copperfield left the convoy at Taranto on 27 February.

Empire Copperfield departed Taranto on 4 March, joining Convoy HA 28, which had departed Bari that day and arrived at Augusta on 6 March. She departed Augusta on 10 March, joining Convoy GUS 33, which had departed Port Said on 5 March and arrived at Hampton Roads on 4 April. She left the convoy at Bône, arriving on 13 March. Empire Copperfield departed Bône on 20 March, joining Convoy KMS 44, which had departed Gibraltar on 17 March and arrived at Port Said on 27 March. She left the convoy at Augusta, arriving on 22 March. Empire Copperfield then joined Convoy VN29, which departed Augusta on 24 March and arrived at Naples, Italy on 25 March. She then joined Convoy NV 29, which departed Naples on 28 March and arrived at Augusta on 29 March.

Empire Copperfield departed Augusta on 31 March, joining Convoy GUS 35, which had departed Port Said on 25 March and arrived at the Hampton Roads on 22 April. She left the convoy at Bône, arriving on 3 April. She departed Bône on 9 April, joining Convoy KMS 46, which had departed Gibraltar on 6 April and arrived at Port Said on 14 April. She left the convoy at Augusta, arriving on 12 April. On 13 April, she joined Convoy VN 33, which arrived at Naples on 14 April. Empire Copperfield then joined Convoy NV 33, which departed Naples on 17 April and arrived at Augusta on 18 April. She departed Augusta on 19 April, joining Convoy GUS 37, which had departed from Port Said on 14 April and arrived at the Hampton Roads on 11 May. Empire Copperfield left the convoy at Algiers, Algeria, arriving on 23 April.

Empire Copperfield departed Algiers on 3 May, joining Convoy GUS 38, which had departed Port Said on 24 April and arrived at the Hampton Roads on 22 May. She left the convoy at Gibraltar, arriving on 5 May. She departed Gibraltar on 10 May as a member of Convoy MKS 48G. Empire Copperfield was carrying a cargo described as "stores" and had three passengers on board. The convoy rendezvoused with Convoy SL 157 on 11 May. The combined convoy arrived at Liverpool, United Kingdom on 22 May.

Empire Copperfield departed Liverpool as a member of Convoy OS 81 on 22 June. She was carrying a cargo of stores bound for Taranto. The convoy split at sea on 3 July, with Convoy KMS55G continuing to Gibraltar, arriving the next day. Empire Copperfield then joined Convoy KMS55, which departed Gibraltar that day and arrived at Port Said on 14 July. She left the convoy at Augusta, arriving on 10 July. Later that day, she departed Augusta as a member of Convoy AH 54, which arrived at Bari on 12 July. Empire Copperfield then sailed to Brindisi, Italy, from where she departed on 22 July as a member of Convoy HA 56, arriving at Augusta on 24 July. She departed Augusta that day as a member of Convoy MKS 56, which had departed from Port Said on 18 July and arrived at Gibraltar on 29 July. She was late in joining the convoy and left it at Algiers, where she arrived on 27 July.

Empire Copperfield departed Algiers on 11 August, joining Convoy UGS 49, which had departed from the Hampton Roads on 24 July and arrived at Port Said on 19 August. She left the convoy at Augusta, arriving on 15 August. She departed Augusta the next day as a member of Convoy VN 59, which arrived at Naples on 17 August.

On 1 September, Empire Copperfield departed Naples as a member of Convoy SM 6, which arrived at a port in southern France on an unspecified date. (Operation Dragoon was taking place at this time). She is then believed to have joined Convoy ARM 5, which departed on 8 September and arrived at Oran, Algeria on 11 September. Empire Copperfield arrived at Algiers on 12 September. On 25 September, she joined Convoy KMS 63, which departed Gibraltar on 23 September and arrived at Port Said on 3 October. She left the convoy at Augusta, on 29 September. The next day, she joined Convoy AH 70, which arrived at Bari on 1 October. She left the convoy at Taranto on 30 September.

Empire Copperfield departed Taranto on 5 October and arrived at Augusta the next day. On 7 October she departed Augusta as a member of Convoy KMS 64, which had departed Gibraltar on 2 October and arrived at Port Said on 12 October. She left the convoy at Alexandria, arriving on 11 October. This was her penultimate convoy of the war. She would now mostly sail independently outside the protection of the convoy system. Empire Copperfield departed Alexandria on 24 October for an unrecorded destination.

Empire Copperfield is next recorded as departing Piraeus, Greece on 8 November and arriving at Alexandria on 11 November. On 19 November she departed Alexandria, arriving at Alexandria on 22 November. She is next recorded as departing Piraeus on 28 November, arriving at Alexandria on 2 December. On 9 December, Empire Copperfield departed Alexandria for Port Said, arriving the next day. On 18 December, she departed Port Said for Augusta, arriving there on 23 December. Empire Copperfield departed Augusta on 28 December and arrived at Naples on 29 December.

1945

Empire Copperfield is recorded as arriving at Naples on 29 January, and departing that same day for an unrecorded destination. She is next recorded as departing Naples on 7 February for Catania, Italy, arriving the next day. On 11 February, she departed Catania for Gibraltar, where she arrived on 16 February. Empire Copperfield departed Gibraltar on 19 February for Casablanca, Morocco, arriving on 21 February. On 25 February, she departed Casablanca for Freetown, Sierra Leone, where she arrived on 6 March. She departed Freetown on 17 March for Casablanca, arriving on 26 March. She departed Casablanca on 31 March to join Convoy MKS 92G, which departed Gibraltar on 31 March and arrived at Liverpool on 8 April. Empire Copperfield was carrying a cargo of iron ore. She was bound for Newport, Monmouthshire, arriving on 7 April.

Empire Copperfield departed Newport on 10 April and arrived at Port Said on 24 June. She departed Suez on 26 June and arrived at Aden on 1 July, departing the same day for Colombo, Ceylon. On 31 July, she departed Colombo for Trincomalee, arriving on 2 August. Empire Copperfield departed Trinocmalee on 8 August for Calcutta, India, where she arrived on 12 August.

=== Postwar service ===
Empire Copperfield was at Calcutta when the Second World War ended. On 20 August, she departed Calcutta for Rangoon, Burma, arriving on 24 August. On 28 August, she departed Rangoon for Calcutta, arriving on 1 September. On 9 September, she departed Calcutta for Rangoon, arriving on 13 September. Empire Copperfield departed Rangoon on 18 September and arrived at Calcutta on 5 October for an unknown destination. She is next recorded as leaving Singapore on 16 October and arriving back there on 3 November. She departed Singapore on 6 December and arrived at Calcutta on 15 December. Empire Copperfield departed Calcutta on 23 December and arrived at Madras, India on 27 December.

In 1946, Empire Copperfield was sold to I Williams & Co Ltd, Cardiff and was renamed Graigwen. In 1958, Graigwen was sold to the Great Eastern Shipping Co, Bombay, India and was renamed Jag Devi. She served until 1963, arriving at Bombay on 19 July for scrapping.
