= Mellon Charles =

Coordinates: 57.85672°N 5.618°W

Mellon Charles: Scottish Gaelic: Meallan Theàrlaich
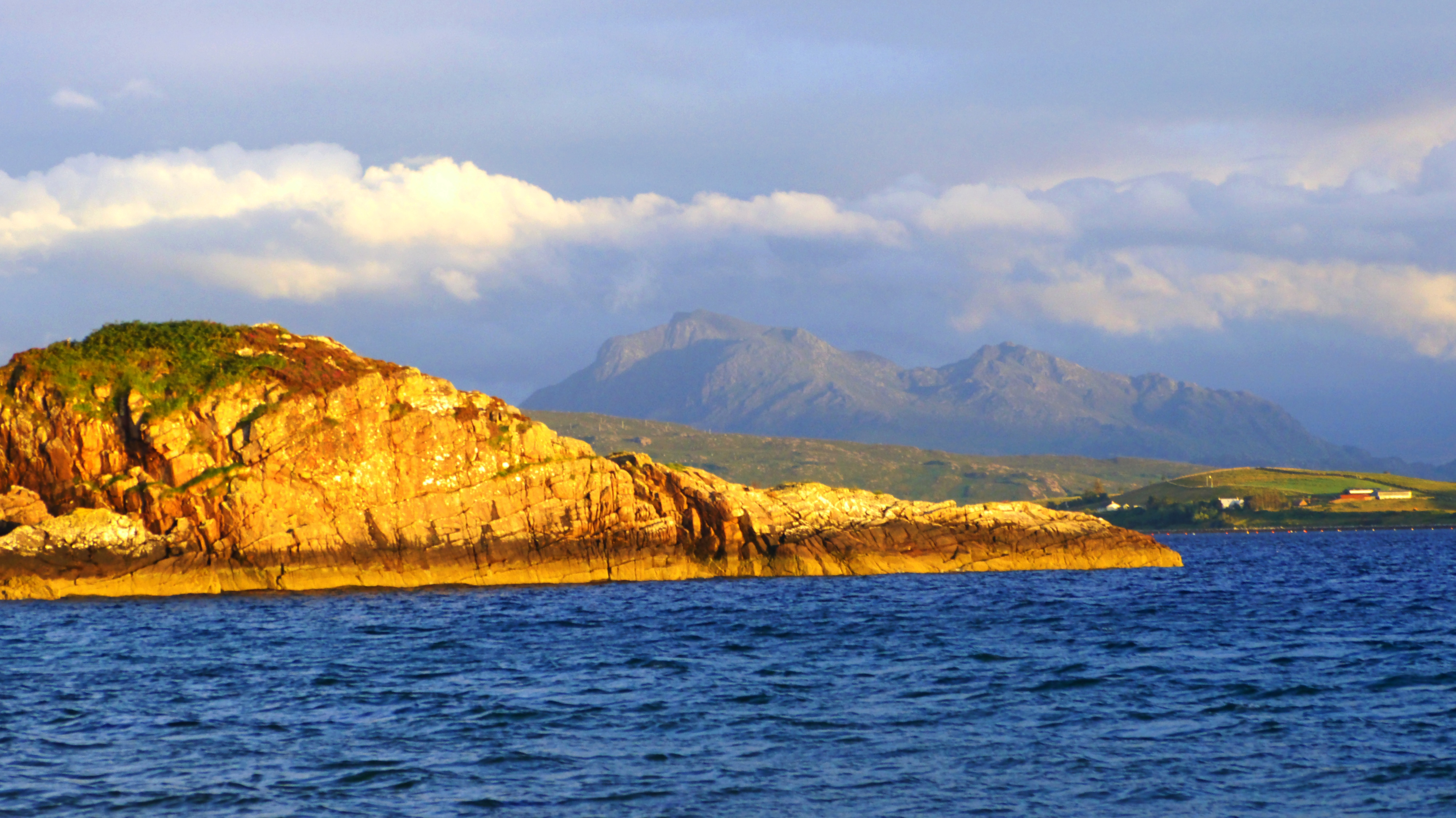
- A view next to the village

- Location within the Ross and Cromarty area
- Population: 80
- OS grid reference: NG854909
- Council area: Highland
- Country: Scotland
- Sovereign state: United Kingdom
- Postcode district: IV22 2
- Police: Scotland
- Fire: Scottish
- Ambulance: Scottish

Mellon Charles (Scottish Gaelic: Meallan Theàrlaich, 'Charles’s Little Hill') is a remote crofting village on Rubha Mòr on the north east shore of Loch Ewe near Gairloch in Wester Ross, in the Highland council area of Scotland. Mellon Charles is the location of a former Royal Navy and Royal Air Force base at Rubh a' Choin point.

The village of Ormiscaig is located less than one mile along the coast road.

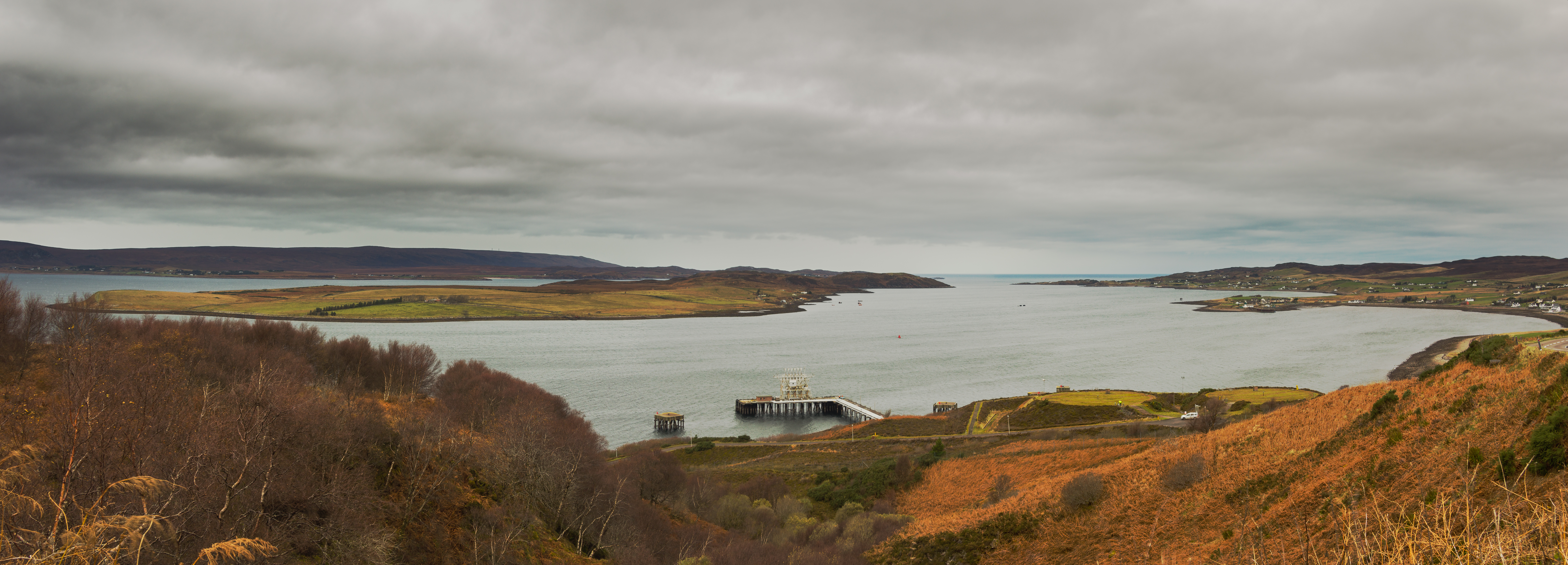
A panoramic view of Loch Ewe looking North with the villages of Aultbea, Ormiscaig and Mellon Charles visible along the Western shore (right-hand side); The NATO POL depot can be seen in the foreground, with the Isle of Ewe a little further out.
