= Don Martinez =

Donald S. Martinez
- Born: 1903; Washington, Connecticut
- Died: 1955 (aged 51–52); Los Angeles, California
- Known for: Commercial fly tying, fly-shop owner
- Spouse: Mary Martinez

Donald S. Martinez (1903–1955), was an American commercial fly tier, fly shop owner and fly angler. He is most noted for his development and promotion of the woolly worm fly and dry fly fishing in the Yellowstone National Park region. He operated a seasonal fly shop in West Yellowstone, Montana during the summers of 1932–1943. Pat Barnes bought the business after World War II and operated the Pat Barnes Tackle Shop until 1981.

== West Yellowstone, Montana ==
Martinez was also a founder of the Izaak Walton League and is credited with introducing dry fly fishing to Yellowstone National Park in the 1930s. To Martinez has been attributed the marketing of the Woolly Worm (imitation) lure for western waters. Northwest Fly Fishing Magazine named Don Martinez to its 'Pioneers & Legends' distinction in the fall of 2004, two years before Zane Grey. Don Martinez has also been featured in the book, Fly Fishing Pioneers & Legends of the Northwest. In his classic 1955 text “Matching The Hatch” Ernest Schwiebert credits Don Martinez with developing the Whitcraft fly pattern, and declares it “excellent in sizes 10 through 16”. Born in Chicago and later relocating to southern California, Martinez was a real estate executive, and son of George D. Martinez and Alice Shillman Martinez. He and his spouse Nola had two children, David G. Martinez and Mary M. Martinez.

== Education ==
Martinez graduated from Cornell University in 1918, and was a member of the Phi Kappa Psi fraternity.

== Sources ==
- Grant, George (Spring 1982). "Don Martinez-Western Dry Fly Master" (PDF). American Fly Fisher. 9 (2). American Museum of Fly Fishing: 9–14. Archived from the original (PDF) on 2014-11-29.
- Berryman, Jack W. (2006). "Donald S. Martinez (circa 1900-1955)". Fly-Fishing Pioneers and Legends of the Northwest. Seattle, WA: Northwest Fly Fishing LLC. pp. 95–99. ISBN 978-0-9779454-0-5.
- Valla, Mike (2013). "Don Martinez (ca.1903-1955)". The Founding Flies-43 American Masters Their Patterns and Influences. Mechanicsburg, PA: Stackpole Books. pp. 217–223. ISBN 9780811708333.
- "54 Founders of the Izaak Walton League". Izaak Walton League. Archived from the original on 2014-11-29.
