= Rubha Mòr =

Peninsula in west Scotland

Coordinates: 57.89°N 5.60°W

Rubha Mòr is a remote peninsula in west Scotland, in the western region of Ross and Cromarty. The peninsula stretches from Greenstone Point in the north to the villages of Poolewe on the southern coastline and Laide on the northern coastline. The region immediately to the east of the peninsula contains Inchgarve Forest and Fionn Loch, which feeds via the Little Gruinard River into Gruinard Bay to the north. Further south are the forests of Letterewe overlooking Loch Maree, and northeast of Fionn Loch are the forests of Fisherfield and Strathnasheallag overlooking Loch na Sealga. The area has some walking routes, but there are few paths and it is also boggy in places.

== Settlements ==
The principal town in the area is Poolewe, on the southeastern flank of the peninsula. The A832 coastal road leads from Poolewe along the coast to the hamlet of Aultbea, whence a secondary B road leads west towards Mellon Charles, a former fishing and significant crofting hamlet.

The A832 continues north, crossing the peninsula, until it reaches the northern coastline at Laide, where it turns southeast along the coast of Gruinard Bay, with another B road branching northward to the villages of Mellon Udrigle and Opinan on the western shore of the bay.
