= Opinan, Laide, Highland =

Coordinates: 57.90974°N 5.57204°W

Opinan
- Location within the Highland council area
- OS grid reference: NG884967
- Council area: Highland
- Country: Scotland
- Sovereign state: United Kingdom
- Post town: Laide
- Postcode district: IV22 2
- Police: Scotland
- Fire: Scottish
- Ambulance: Scottish

Opinan is a hamlet, in Achnasheen, Ross-shire, Scottish Highlands on Rubha Mòr and is in the Scottish council area of Highland.

The village of Mellon Udrigle lies directly to the southeast.
