= Isle of Ewe =

Small Scottish island

Eilean Iùbh (Gaelic)
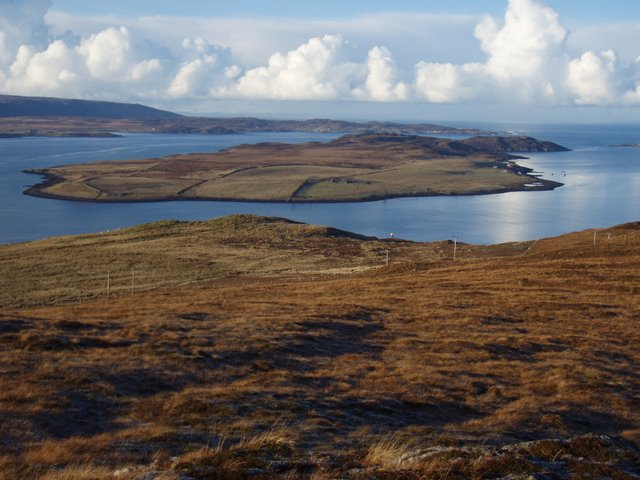
- Looking north west over the Isle of Ewe

Location
- Isle of Ewe shown within Highland Scotland
- OS grid reference: NG855885
- Coordinates: 57.83°N 5.61°W

Name
- Gaelic pronunciation: [ˈelan ˈjuː]
- Name meaning: Yew

Physical geography
- Island group: Loch Ewe
- Area: 309 ha (760 acres)
- Area rank: 87=
- Highest elevation: Creag Streap 72 m (236 ft)

Administration
- Council area: Highland
- Country: Scotland
- Sovereign state: United Kingdom

Demographics
- Population: 7
- Population rank: 72=
- Population density: 2.2/km^{2} (5.7/sq mi)

The Isle of Ewe (Scottish Gaelic: Eilean Iùbh) is a small Scottish island on the west coast of Ross and Cromarty. The island is inhabited by a single extended family, the Grants, who have lived at the current settlement on the leeward NE side of the island since the 19th century.

The island is privately owned by GBB Estates Ltd and Crofted by the Grants. The island previously had more families, but these left during the Second World War, when Loch Ewe was used as an important naval anchorage. The isolated position of the island meant that the children had to endure a round trip each day of about 26 miles (42 kilometres) by boat and bus to attend school.

The island remains off grid for electricity and water with this being generated by renewables and back up generators. There remains a single phone cable to the mainland which services the current households and is the only physical connection to the mainland.

Residents and visitors to the island use the Pier at Aultbea daily to travel back and forth for work and supplies.

== Origin of the name ==
There are two competing theories about the meaning of the name; it may be derived from the Old Irish eo, "yew tree", or alternatively from the Gaelic eubh, "echo", reflecting a place-name on the adjoining mainland.

== Geography and geology ==
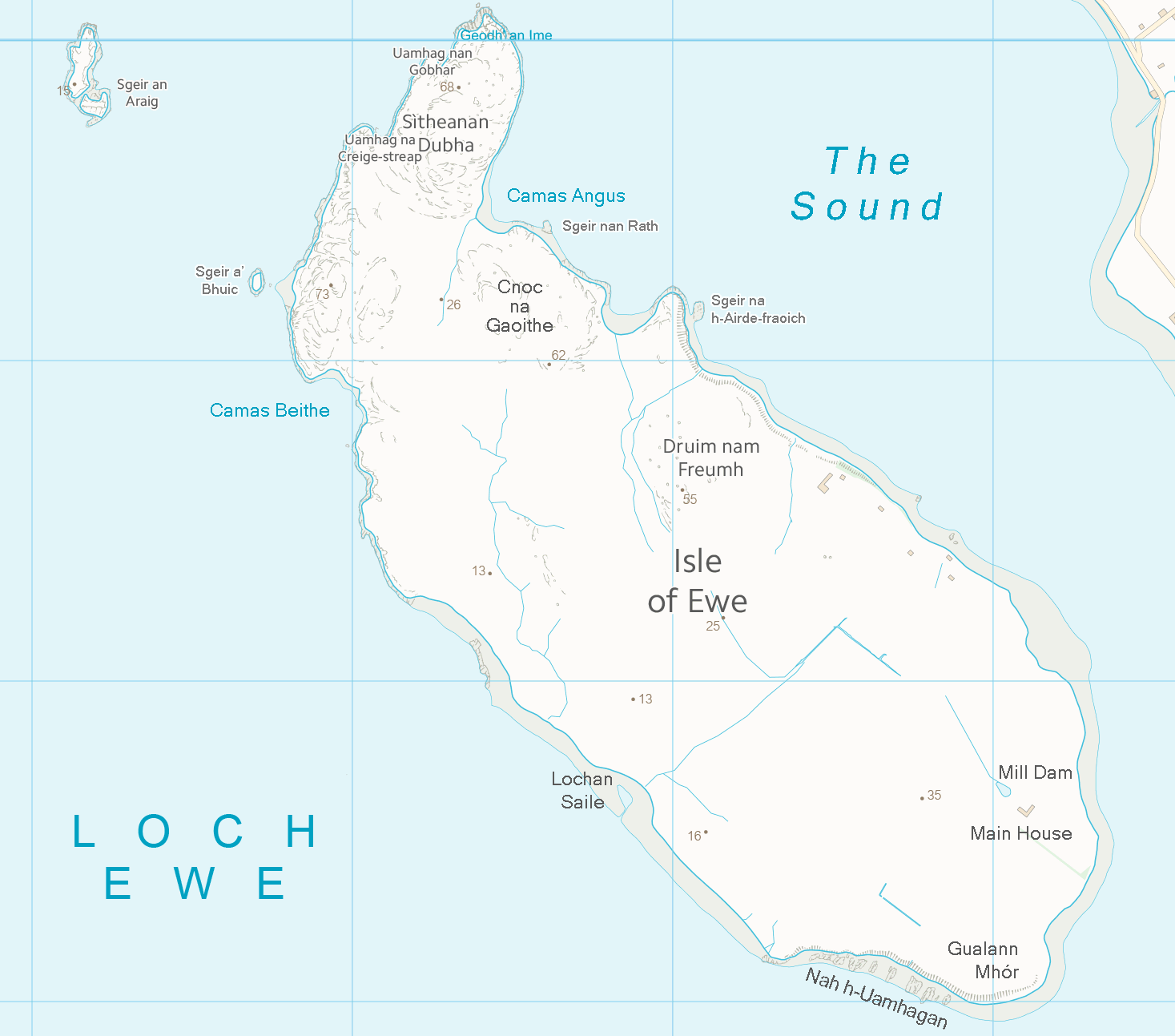
Map of the Isle of Ewe

The Isle of Ewe is located in Loch Ewe, west of Aultbea in the Ross and Cromarty district of the Highland Region. The island is made up of two principal types of sandstone (Torridonian with acidic soil in the north, Permian or Triassic with more fertile soil in the south) and the shore line varies from flat pebble beaches to cliffs. It is part of the Wester Ross National Scenic Area, one of 40 in Scotland.

The island was originally wooded, as recorded in 1549 by Donald Monro who wrote in his Description of the Western Isles of Scotland: "Ellan Ew, haffe myle in length, full of woods, guid for thieves to wait upon uther mens gaire. It perteins to M’Enzie." Similarly, George Buchanan wrote in his Rerum Scoticarum Historia (History of Scotland) of 1579 that the island was "almost all covered with woods, and good for nothing but to harbour thieves, who rob passengers." Both Monro and Buchanan (who probably used Monro as a source) mistakenly located the island in Loch Broom, instead of Loch Ewe. By the time Black's Picturesque Tourist of Scotland was published in 1889, the Isle of Ewe was "in a state of high cultivation; the fields large and well fenced, having been all reclaimed from moorland. There is an extensive dairy on the island." Today the southern part of the island is predominantly low-lying farmland, while its northern part remains uncultivated.

The most elevated part of the Isle of Ewe is its northern peninsula, rising to 72 metres (236 feet) at Creag Streap ("climbing cliff"); a prominent rock, Sgeir a' Bhuich ("rock of the roe-buck") lies just offshore, with a larger rocky island, Sgeir an Araig, situated further out in the loch to the north-west of the Isle of Ewe. A peaty hilly area called Sitheanan Dubha ("the black fairy hillocks") occupies most of the island's northern peninsula. It reaches a height of 68 metres (223 feet) and is dominated by coarse grass, heather and sphagnum moss. In the 1880s, a group of boys reported seeing fairies at that spot. Immediately to the south are two bays – Camas Angus ("Angus' bay") and Camas Beithe ("birch-tree bay") – that afford anchorage to boats. The hummock of Cnoc na Gaoithe ("windy knoll") provides shelter to the two bays. The arable land begins a short distance further south beyond Druim nam Freumh ("ridge of roots"), where a small area of woodland stands. A jetty, built after the Second World War, provides boat access to the mainland.

The island has no regularly scheduled boat service, but access can be arranged at Aultbea.

== Cultural references ==
Because the name of the island sounds like "I love you", it has become popular for couples to take boat trips around the island.

For the same reason, it was also featured as a desert island in the second chapter of Telltale Games' adventure game Tales of Monkey Island: The Siege of Spinner Cay.

The island's name also came up in The Goon Show, during the November 1954 episode "Lurgi Strikes Britain." Neddie Seagoon is informed that the "dreaded lurgi" has appeared on the Isle of Ewe, to which he replies, "I love you too. Shall we dance?"

There is a love song "A Scenic Route To The Isle Of Ewe" by Aidan Moffat whose name might be motivated by the same phonetic association.

== See also ==
- List of islands of Scotland
