= Woolly Worm (imitation) =

Artificial fishing fly

- Artificial fly
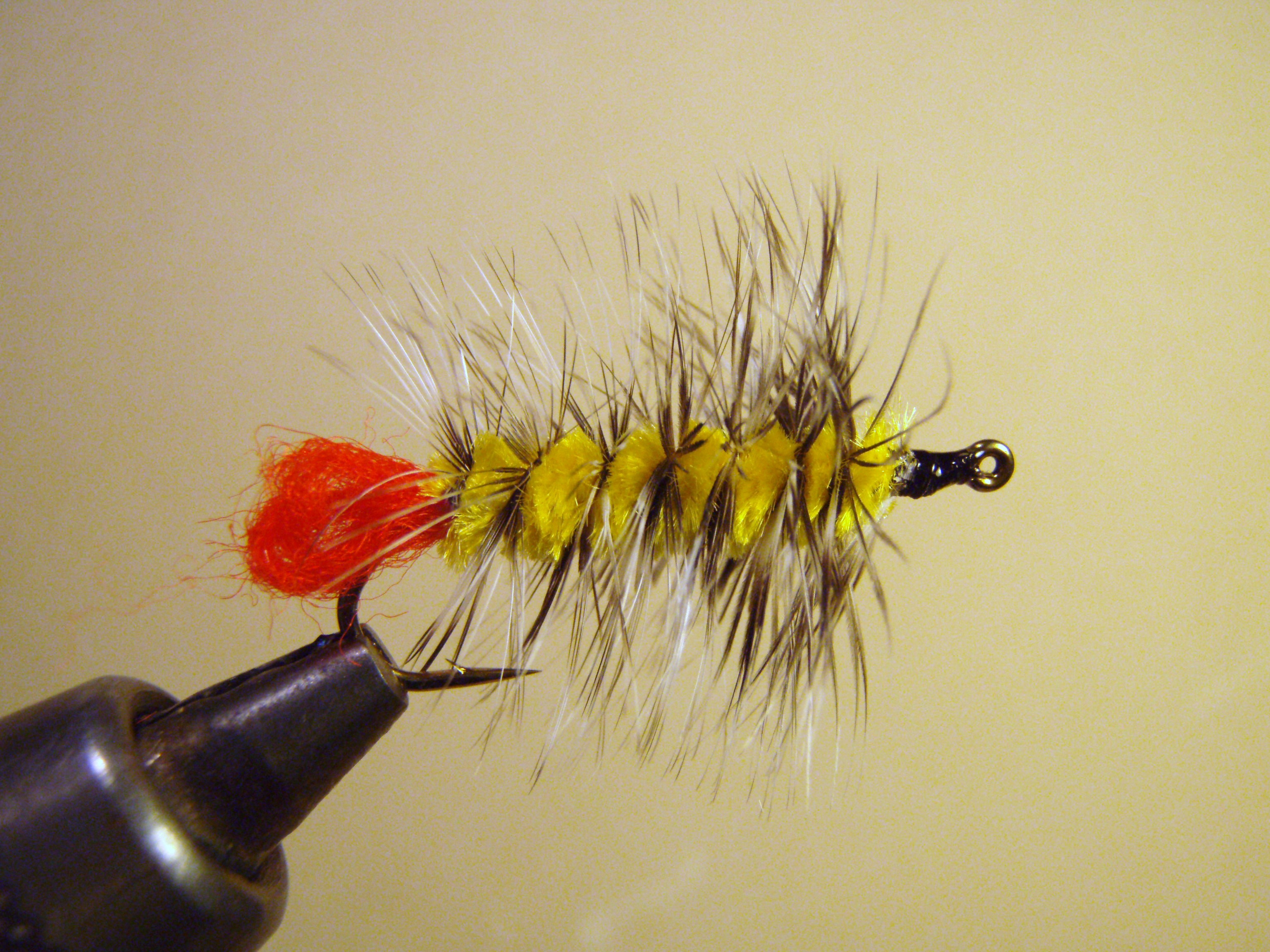
- Yellow and Grizzly Woolly Worm tied in its classic form
- Type: Wet fly, nymph
- Imitates: large aquatic nymphs of stoneflies, dragonflies, damselflies or hellgrammites

History
- Creator: Unknown, popularized by Don Martinez (1950s)
- Created: 1920s
- Variations: Tied with various body, tail and hackle colors, weighted and unweighted

Materials
- Typical sizes: 6-12
- Thread: Black 6/0
- Tail: Short red yarn
- Body: Chenille in black, yellow or green
- Ribbing: Gold wire (optional)
- Hackle: Grizzly neck or saddle
- Head: Black thread

Uses
- Primary use: Trout, Bass, Panfish

Reference(s)
- Pattern references: Woolly Wisdom (2005), Soucie

The Woolly Worm is an artificial fly commonly categorized as a wet fly or nymph and is fished under the water surface. It is a popular pattern for freshwater game fish and was a very popular fly in the 1950s–1970s in the west. Charles Brooks in Nymph Fishing for Larger Trout recommends the Woolly Worm as a general purpose nymph pattern in most western trout waters in any fly box. Woolly Worms are typically fished in streams, rivers, ponds, and lakes for trout, bass, and panfish. Today, Woolly Worms are tied in a variety of styles and colors to imitate a large aquatic nymphs such as stoneflies, dragonflies, damselflies or hellgrammites.

== Origin ==
The original Woolly Worm pattern is said to have originated in the Ozarks as a bass fly. Its real popularity, however, came when Don Martinez, a West Yellowstone, Montana, fly tier, commercialized the pattern in the 1950s.

== Imitates ==
The Woolly Worm, depending the specific material used and how it is fished can be assumed to resemble large nymphs, more specifically stoneflies, dragonflies, damselflies, riffle beetle larvae or hellgrammites.

== Materials ==
The original Woolly Worm fly was constructed without a tail, but the contemporary pattern has a yarn tail or hackle fiber tail. The body is a chenille or fur body with a hackle palmered from the tail to the head of the fly. The underbody may be weighted with lead wire. The popular colors are yellow, olives, browns, blacks. The most common hackle used is grizzly.

== Variations and sizes ==
Woolly Worm flies are typically tied on number 4 to 10 3X long hooks. Variations include Woolly Worms weighted with lead underbodies or brass or tungsten beads.

Woolly Worm Gallery
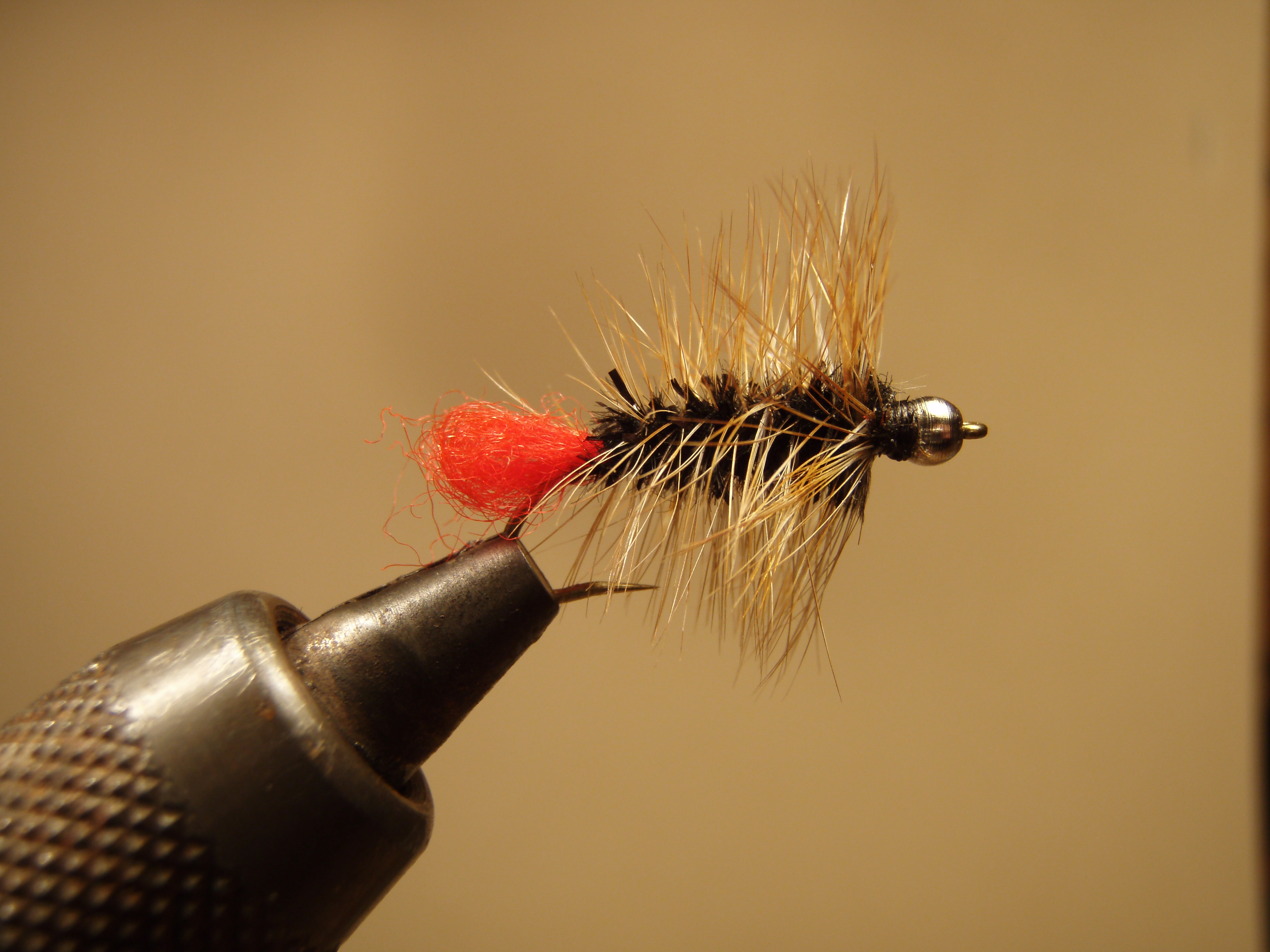
Black and Brown Beadhead Woolly Worm

Black Woolly Worm with a red hackle tail

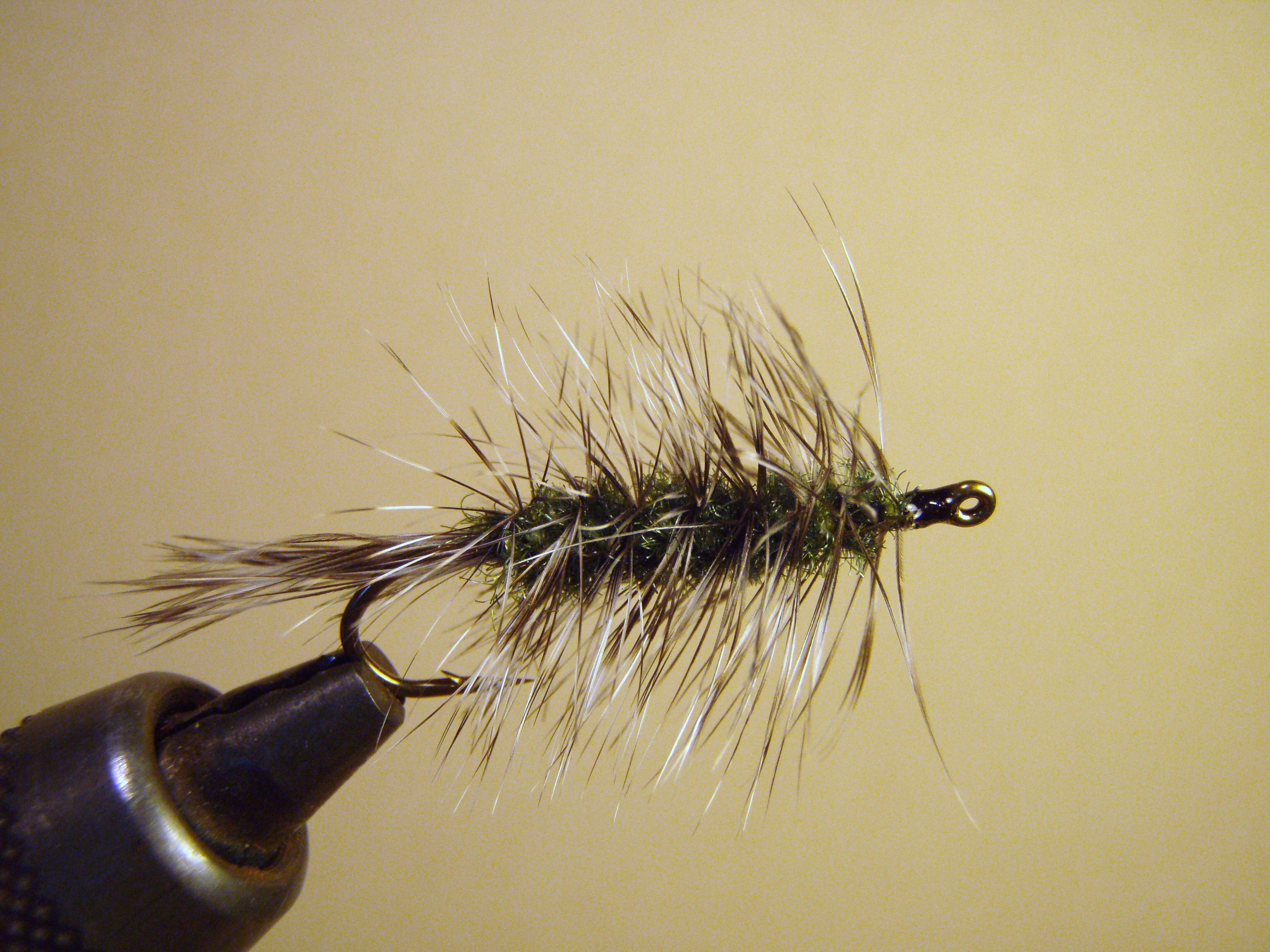
Grizzly and Olive Woolly Worm
