= Paul Fentener van Vlissingen =

Dutch businessman and writer (1941–2006)

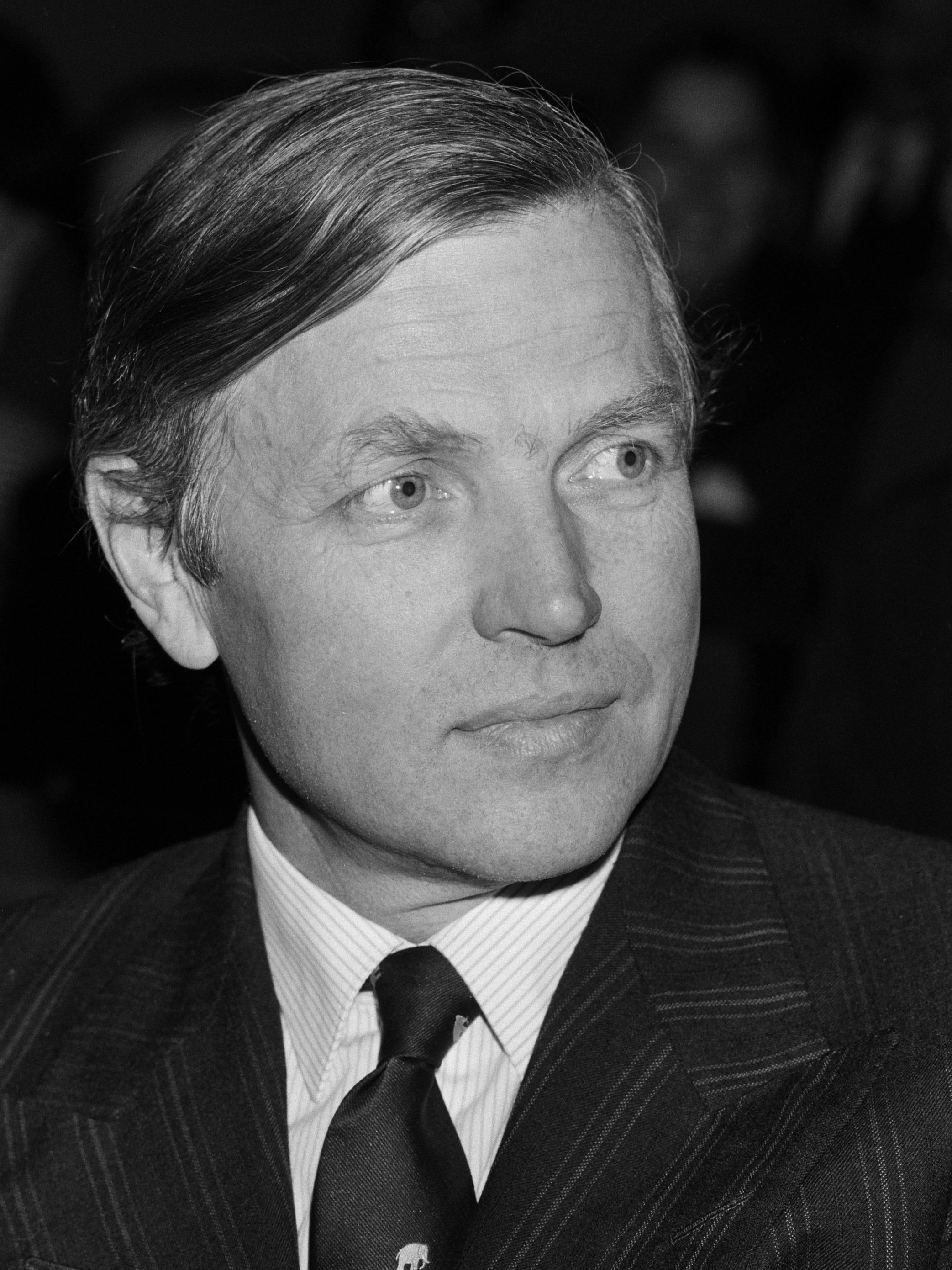
Fentener van Vlissingen in 1989

Paul Fentener van Vlissingen (21 March 1941 – 21 August 2006) was a Dutch businessman and philanthropist who was CEO of SHV Holdings for three decades. He contributed to the development of game reserves in Africa and purchased the Letterewe estate in Scotland in 1978. He pledged the right to roam there prior to the passage of the Scottish Land Reform Act of 2003.

== Early life and background ==
Born in Utrecht, Paul Fentener van Vlissingen was the youngest son of Frits Fentener van Vlissingen II. The van Vlissingen family was a leading Dutch industrialist family whose fortune was based on shipping coal on the Rhine in the 19th century. Paul's father, described as one of the "fathers of the Dutch economy", had co-founded SHV Holdings through a merger with eight other Dutch trading families in 1896 and later bought out most of the other families. Originally Europe's largest coal wholesaling business, SHV Holdings is the largest privately owned company in the Netherlands.

== Career at SHV Holdings ==
Fentener van Vlissingen inherited a significant shareholding in the company SHV Holdings from his father and studied economics at the University of Groningen before joining SHV. In May 1974, he joined the SHV board and he succeeded his brother, Frits III, as chairman in 1980.

Fentener van Vlissingen led SHV as chief executive officer for three decades from the mid-1960s. Under his leadership the company diversified into new areas ahead of the collapse of the coal market in the 1960s. The areas he became involved with included retail, through the Makro and Otto Reichelt chains of grocery supermarkets and cash & carries, and energy, through the acquisitions of liquified petroleum gas companies including Calor Gas in the UK and Primagaz in France. He also diversified into scrap metal, recycling, oil exploration, renewable energy and private equity. In 1995, he stepped down and then served as non-executive chairman.

Fentener van Vlissingen had a maverick and unconventionally philosophical leadership style. He allowed young managers whom he trusted to establish Makro operations in overseas markets, giving them unusual amounts of autonomy. He recognised the possibility of global warming as early as the early 1990s and had a love for cryptic aphorisms. In 2001, he wrote a book discussing his business experiences directing a large multi-national conglomerate entitled Ondernemers zijn ezels, which can be translated as Entrepreneurs are Jackasses. He followed this up in 2002 with a book entitled Overstekende ezels, translated Crossing Jackasses. In this second book he discussed his views regarding entrepreneurs, corruption, ambition, the euro, money, honesty, change and success.

== Philanthropy and conservation ==
Fentener Van Vlissingen was recognised as a conservationist and contributed to the development of game reserves in Scotland, South Africa, Malawi, Zambia and Ethiopia. In 1978, he bought the wild and roadless 85,000 acres (340 km^{2}) Letterewe estate in Wester Ross, and in 2006 was described as the largest foreign landowner in Scotland. "I don't call myself the owner," he said of Letterewe. "You can't own a place like this. It belongs to the planet. I'm only the guardian of it." The Letterewe Accord, an agreement that gave ramblers freedom of access to the entire Letterewe estate in exchange for a pledge to respect the land, predated the Scottish Parliament's own right-to-roam legislation by over a decade.

He was known for the "habit of inviting everyone, whether landowners, journalists, birdwatchers or ramblers, to visit the estate and talk about issues face to face." He sometimes saddled a pony with a week's provisions and disappeared into the hills, staying at a bothy without lights or a toilet. He also proposed reintroducing wolves and lynx to this estate.

After a near fatal brush with non-Hodgkin lymphoma in 1980, he founded the Van Vlissingen Cancer Fund, which is now one of the major cancer fundraisers in the Netherlands.

From 1994 until his death, his home was the Conholt Park estate in Wiltshire, England, on the border with Hampshire. Here, too, he applied sustainable land management and nature conservation.

Van Vlissingen was also a great supporter of Scottish Gaelic and in 2006 donated £250,000 to Sabhal Mòr Ostaig, a Gaelic college on Skye.

== Death and legacy ==
In April 2006, van Vlissingen announced that he had terminal pancreatic cancer and that he would not be having chemotherapy. He said: "In the Western world we mistakenly try to keep death at bay. I look to Native Americans instead. When they see their death approaching, they visit good friends and family to share happy memories and look back at the good things."

In an interview with the Dutch newspaper De Telegraaf published in April 2006, he said: "Our planet is in a much sorrier state than it was when I was a child. The destruction cannot go on at this pace. My generation should be ashamed of the condition in which we are passing on our planet to future generations."

In August 2006, the cancer got worse and led to his death on the night of 20–21 August 2006, in Langbroek. The news of his death was released to the public on 22 August.

In February 2006, it emerged that in his will Fentener van Vlissingen left a significant portion of his estate to his partner, the former Guardian art critic Caroline Tisdall, as well as several million to his lover, the Dutch businesswoman Suzanne Wolff. The Scotsman reported that Tisdall had been prepared to tolerate the billionaire's relationship with Wolff in his latter years. He left the bulk of his fortune and the Letterewe estate in north-west Scotland to his two daughters, Alicia and Tet, and to their children.
