= Mellon Udrigle =

Coordinates: 57.902041°N 5.563252°W

Mellon Udrigle: Scottish Gaelic: Meallan Ùdraigil
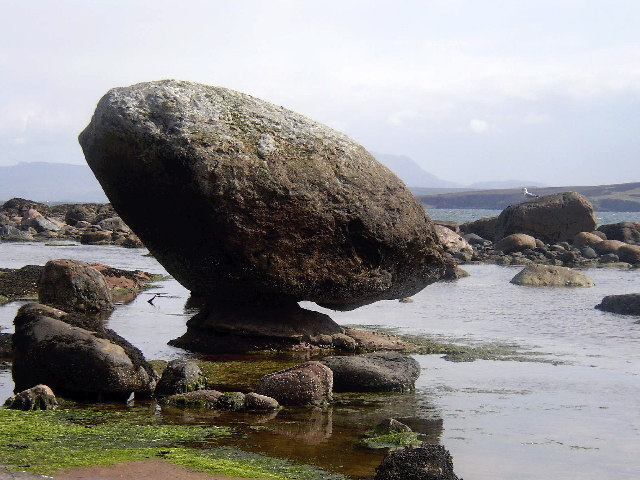
- Boulder at Laide. This large boulder is perched precariously on the shore next to the fishing station

- Location within the Ross and Cromarty area
- Population: 45
- OS grid reference: NG883956
- Council area: Highland
- Country: Scotland
- Sovereign state: United Kingdom
- Post town: Achnasheen
- Postcode district: IV22 2
- Police: Scotland
- Fire: Scottish
- Ambulance: Scottish

Mellon Udrigle (Scottish Gaelic: Meallan Ùdraigil or Na Meall) is a small remote coastal tourist, fishing and crofting hamlet on the north west coast located in the district of aultbea on Rubha Mòr. Ross-shire, Scottish Highlands and is in the Scottish council area of Highland.

The village of Opinan is directly to the north and the village of Achgarve is directly to the south, and Laide slightly further south.

Mellon Udrigle is home to the site of an ancient Pictish hut circle.
