= Letterewe =

Large estate in Scotland

Coordinates: 57.6825°N 5.43137°W

Letterewe is a large estate of several tens of thousands of acres on the north-eastern shore of Loch Maree, South-East of Poolewe, in Wester Ross, Scotland. It is one of the wildest, most remote, and least populated areas in the United Kingdom.

The estate was once in the possession of the Clan Mackenzie. In 1835, it was purchased by the Lancashire coal magnate Meyrick Bankes (1811 - 1881), who evicted many of the crofting tenants. In 1978 it was bought by the Dutch multi-millionaire Paul Fentener van Vlissingen, and it remains in the ownership of his family. In the 1990s, he negotiated with representative interested groups the "Letterewe Accord", which was revolutionary in its provisions for public access to the estate prior to the general Scottish Land Reform of 2003.

== In fiction ==
Ewan M'Gabhar, one of the tales and sketches of James Hogg ("the Ettrick Shepherd"), is set in Letterewe.
