= Laide =

Coordinates: 57.86501°N 5.54196°W

Laide: Scottish Gaelic: An Leathad
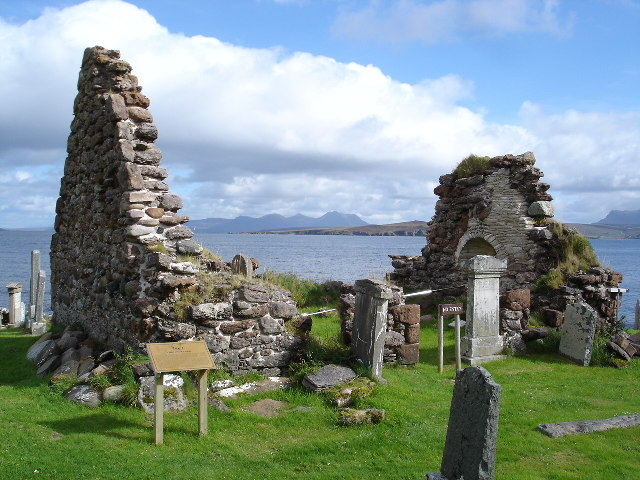
- The ruins of the medieval chapel, Laide

- Location within the Ross and Cromarty area
- Population: 120
- OS grid reference: NG900916
- Council area: Highland
- Lieutenancy area: Ross and Cromarty
- Country: Scotland
- Sovereign state: United Kingdom
- Post town: Achnasheen
- Postcode district: IV22 2
- Police: Scotland
- Fire: Scottish
- Ambulance: Scottish

Laide (Scottish Gaelic: An Leathad) is a small village in the northwest of the Highlands of Scotland. It is situated on the southern shore of Gruinard Bay, about 30 km west of Ullapool.

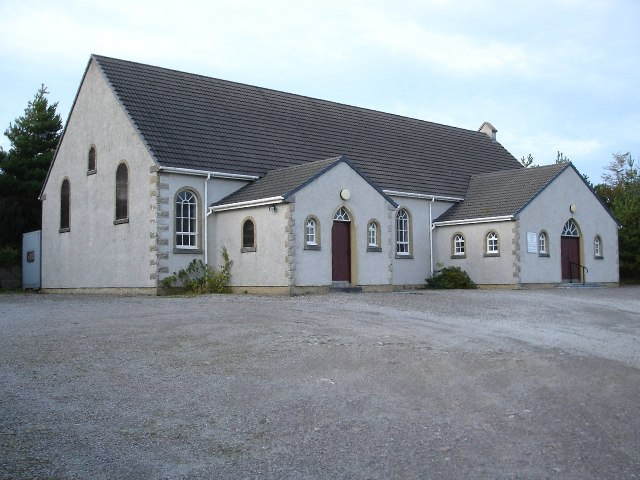
Free Presbyterian Church of Scotland, Laide

== Laide Wood ==
Situated just outside Laide on the A832 heading West is 'Laide Community Wood'. Owned and managed by a charity called Laide Wood for the benefit the local community, Laide wood is recreational facility open all year round.

== Geography ==
The village offers views of Gruinard Island and the Summer Isles. The area has many beaches such as at Mellon Udrigle and Gruinard which are within 5 minutes' driving distance of the village. Gairloch, with its many facilities is within 20 minutes driving distance.

The A832 road runs through Laide.
