= Loch Ewe =

Sea loch in Scotland

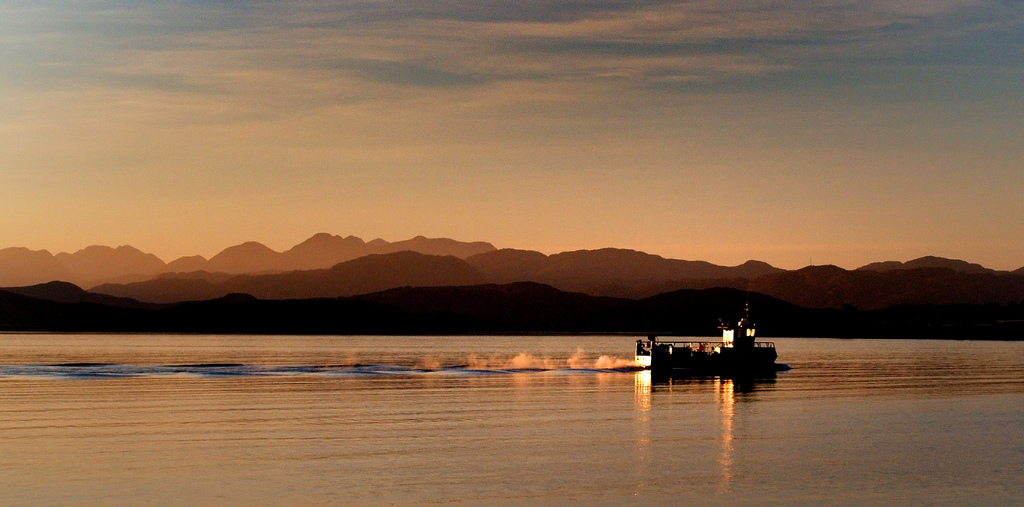
- A Creel Boat on Loch Ewe at dawn

- Location within Highland
- Location: Northwest Highlands, Scotland
- Coordinates: 57°50′13″N 5°36′44″W
- Primary inflows: River Ewe
- Primary outflows: The Minch
- Basin countries: United Kingdom
- Average depth: 15 m (49 ft)
- Max. depth: 40 m (130 ft)
- Islands: Isle of Ewe

Loch Ewe (Scottish Gaelic: Loch Iùbh) is a sea loch in the region of Wester Ross in the Northwest Highlands of Scotland. The shores are inhabited by a traditionally Gàidhlig-speaking people living in or sustained by crofting villages, the most notable of which, situated on the north-eastern shore, is the Aultbea settlement.

== History ==
Due to the rugged and inaccessible terrain in which it is located, Loch Ewe has always been an assembly point for maritime trade. Around 1610 the area at the head of Loch Ewe, today known as Poolewe, was urbanised around an iron furnace using charcoal produced in the surrounding woodlands for fuel. English ironmasters found it more economic to ship the ore to Poolewe for smelting than to ship the processed charcoal to England to run furnaces there.

The crofting villages which were established in the 1840s, as a result of the local parish's estate being reformed from run-rig to fixed holdings properties, were always quite small. Bualnaliub, nine miles (fifteen kilometres) to the north of Poolewe, had eleven houses and fifty people at the 1841 census – twenty-three of whom were from the same (McIver) family. Mellon Charles, four miles (six kilometres) to the west, had two hundred and sixteen people in forty-one houses – including seventeen houses headed by a McLennan. Ormiscaig, roughly halfway between them, had ten houses (four headed by McGregors) totalling forty-eight people. One hundred and forty years later, in 1981, the population was ten at Bualnaluib, twenty-four at Ormiscaig and one hundred and ten at Mellon Charles.

In 1911 a 70-foot (21-metre) lighthouse was built on the promontory between Gairloch and Poolewe.

Loch Ewe was a temporary base of the Home Fleet during the Second World War. It was also used as an assembly point for the Arctic Convoys during the war. Ships from the British, American and other ports gathered here before sailing to Murmansk from September 1942 following the disaster of Convoy PQ 17 in order to confuse German intelligence.

At the German surrender in April 1945 Loch Ewe became the British marshalling point for many of the German U-boats that had surrendered while at sea.

=== Tournaig ===
According to the published correspondence of a local resident, the Royal Navy established watchkeeping defences around an inlet to the south-east of Loch Ewe, sourcing the area for its cod, haddock, and mackerel reserves:

Our farmhouse was used as a barracks by the anti-aircraft battery which had emplacements around the south and east sides of the Loch [Ewe]. The concrete foundations and bomb shelters [built out of favour for the locals] still remain in the Torridon Hills. The gunners lived in a large wooden hut on the bank above the house. There was an enormous balloon shed by the shore for barrage balloons. We kept the sea boats there in winter, when the gales were prodigious. On the shore was a small concrete jetty, off which lay a summer mooring for the lobster boat. The navy had very kindly put in this mooring for my parents – a buoy about three feet [90 cm] long, with a chain down to a large concrete block on the seabed.

In front of the house to the south was a fresh water loch – Loch nan Dalthein – which was about two miles (3 km) long and a mile (1.5 km) wide with a waist half way up. It had many small rather dark trout and the occasional sea-trout, which immigrated up the river running down to the sea. When the river got to the coast, it tumbled down a steep rocky bank, into which was built a "salmon ladder" – a series of small pools stepped down like a staircase. The drop between each pool was small enough for the fish to jump up on their way from Loch Tournaig to Loch nan Dalthein.

The dam which fed the salmon ladder also provided a crude form of hydro electricity – there was a small generator hut at the bottom with a millrace along the top of the bank, to provide a head of water. It generated one hundred and ten volts for the house about half a mile (800 m) away. Electricity was turned off at 10.00 pm.

The whole anchorage at Loch Ewe was fairly well sheltered for shipping and protected from the worst weather. It was much further from Norway than the Navy's main base at Scapa Flow, thus inconvenient for German bombers (who would have been at the limit of their range). In fact, there was so much bad blood between the Luftwaffe and the Kriegsmarine that I don't think any attacks ever took place. This wilful lack of co-operation was a big factor in the sinking of Tirpitz in Norway during the war - she was left largely unprotected, and the RAF and Fleet Air Arm did what the Germans failed to do. It was said Loch Ewe was big enough to contain the whole Royal Navy. I don't know whether this is true - but it was important for the Atlantic convoy escorts. Also, I presume, the Russian convoys, but that is speculation.

One major benefit from a naval presence was the building of a road from the railway station at Achnasheen about forty miles [65 km] away – the railway went from Inverness to Kyle of Lochalsh. Until the 1860s there was no road at all. During the potato famine a track was built to provide local employment. It was literally a cart track - you can still trace parts where the new road by-passed certain sections. The new road was "single track with passing places" up the west side of Loch Maree. It would take cars and small lorries to provide a land access to the naval base on Loch Ewe. It had a big impact on the local economy as fish could then be exported to the south.

=== NATO Z-berths and POL depots ===
As of 2006, the Mellon Charles base is still in use, with two berths authorised for nuclear-powered submarine use. The jetty at Aultbea is designated a "Z-berth" to allow NATO's nuclear submarines to return for servicing without warning. A second Z-berth is located in the middle of Loch Ewe itself, marked by a buoy but not appearing on any Ordnance Survey maps.

The naval boom defence depot at Mellon Charles marks the start of the original protective netting which guarded the entrance to the loch. Part of the base is designated a petroleum, oil and lubricants (POL) depot. This provides for the maintenance of visiting warships.

== Culture ==
Loch Ewe is often praised for its scenic beauty, especially in the vistas from the so-called midnight walk (the A832 single-track road to the left of Loch Kernsary) about 1 1/2 miles (2.5 kilometres) to the north of Tournaig. This is the subject of many strathspeys still sung today in local ceilidh. Additionally, it has several outposts above the Aultbea foreshore (around Aird Point) giving photo opportunities for tourists travelling inland.

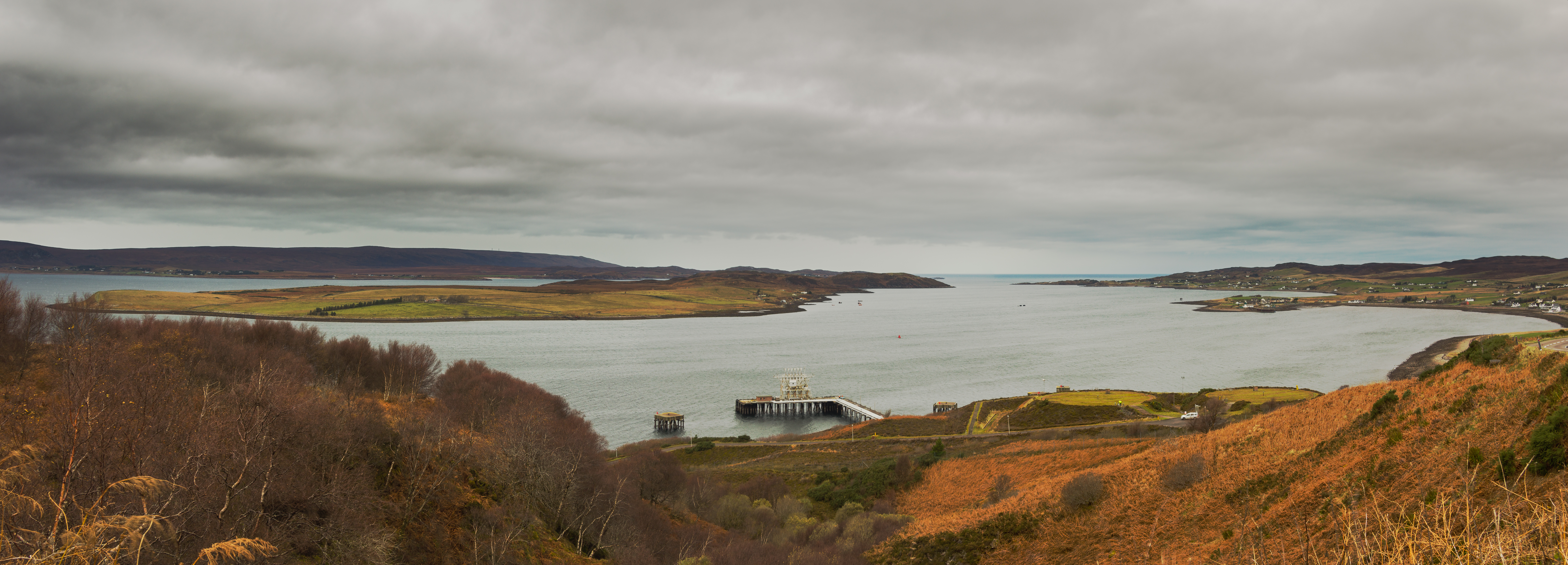
A panoramic view of Loch Ewe looking North with the villages of Aultbea, Ormiscaig and Mellon Charles visible along the Western shore (right-hand side); The NATO POL depot can be seen in the foreground, with the Isle of Ewe a little further out.
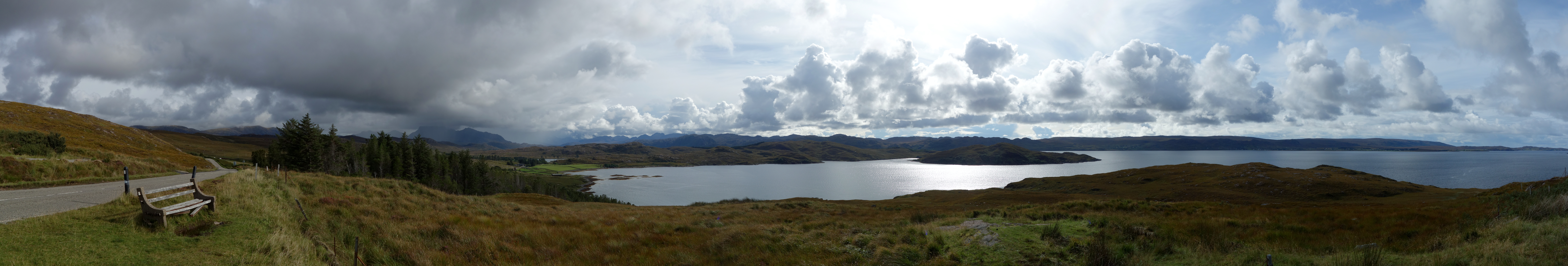
A panoramic view of the southern end of Loch Ewe looking Southwest, with the bay Loch Thurnaig in the center of the image.

=== Ancient Mariner folklore ===
In his compendium of folk and faerie (encounters with the Daoine Sìth race) tales of the mainland, Sir George Douglas records that the ancestral dialogues and mythological apologues of the Scottish peasantry, and the folkish customs employed in recounting them, "still linger in the remote western islands of Barra; where, in the long winter nights, the people would gather in crowds to listen to those whom they considered good exponents of the art. At an earlier date, – but still, at that time [in the mid twentieth century], within living memory, – the custom survived at Poolewe in Ross-shire where the young people were used to assemble [sic] at night to hear the old ones recite the tales which they had learned from their fore-fathers. Here, and at earlier dates in other parts of the country also, the demand for stories would further be supplied by travelling pedlars, or by gaberlunzie men, or pauper wandering musicians and entertainers, or by the itinerant shoemaker or tailor – 'Whip-the-Cat' as he was nicknamed, – both of which last were accustomed to travel through thinly-populated country districts, in the pursuit of their calling, and to put up for the night at farm-houses, – where, whilst plying their needles, they would entertain the company with stories.

"The arrival of one of these story-tellers in a village was an important event. As soon as it became known, there would be a rush to the house where he was lodged, and every available seat – on bench, table, bed, beam, or the floor – would quickly be appropriated. And then, for hours together – just like some first-rate actor on a stage – the story-teller would hold his audience spell-bound. During his recitals, the emotions of the reciter were occasionally very strongly excited, as were also those of his listeners, who at one time would be on the verge of tears, at another give way to laughter. There were many of these listeners, by the way, who believed firmly in all the extravagances narrated.

And such rustic scenes as these, as I [will show], have by no means been without their marked upon Scottish literature."

=== Dialect ===
The Ross-shire dialect of Highland English is spoken in Red Point (nearby Gairloch) and Poolewe. It is "somewhat similar to that of the Southern Hebridean [Harris and Barra] dialects." Pre-aspiration involves "a very distinct and long h, often with a slight velar friction; though this h is different from x, which has more friction, and there exist such pairs as bohk 'a buck' boc ~bcxk 'poor' bochd. When the occlusive is palatal, h is not affected by the palatality."
