= List of Category A listed buildings in the Western Isles =

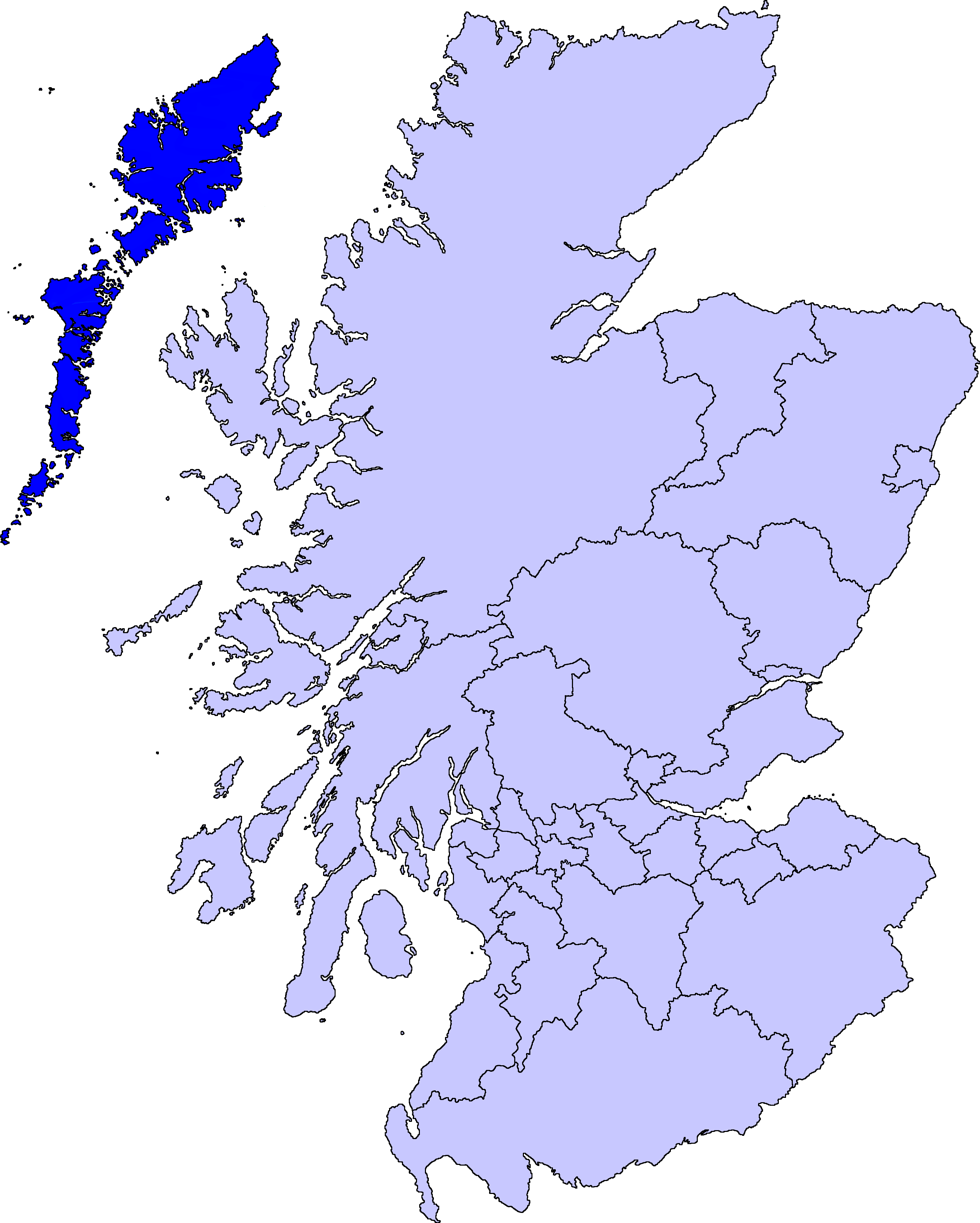
The Western Isles shown within Scotland

This is a list of Category A listed buildings in the Western Isles of Scotland (Scottish Gaelic: Na h-Eileanan Siar).

In Scotland, the term listed building refers to a building or other structure officially designated as being of "special architectural or historic interest". Category A structures are those considered to be "buildings of national or international importance, either architectural or historic, or fine little-altered examples of some particular period, style or building type." Listing was begun by a provision in the Town and Country Planning (Scotland) Act 1947, and the current legislative basis for listing is the Planning (Listed Buildings and Conservation Areas) (Scotland) Act 1997. The authority for listing rests with Historic Scotland, an executive agency of the Scottish Government, which inherited this role from the Scottish Development Department in 1991. Once listed, severe restrictions are imposed on the modifications allowed to a building's structure or its fittings. Listed building consent must be obtained from local authorities prior to any alteration to such a structure. There are approximately 47,400 listed buildings in Scotland, of which around 8% (or approximately 3,800) are Category A.

The council area of Na h-Eileanan Siar (Western Isles) comprises an archipelago of over 100 islands and small skerries, including 14 inhabited islands with a total population of around 26,500. There are 18 Category A listed buildings on the islands, representing a variety of types and ages of structure. The 13th-century Church of St Moluag is one of three A-listed church buildings. Kisimul Castle, built on a tiny island off the shore of Castlebay, dates from the 15th century, while the two other A-listed castles at Amhuinnsuidhe and Lews are Victorian. Functional architecture includes three important lighthouses, including Eilean Glas, the first lighthouse in the Western Isles. More prosaic building types are well represented, with eight traditional thatched cottages meriting Category A listing.

== Listed buildings ==
Name	Location	Date listed	Geo-coordinates	Notes	LB number	Image
Butt of Lewis Lighthouse	Butt of Lewis	25 March 1971	58°30′56″N 6°15′39″W	Built in the 1860s and designed by David Stevenson	5768	Upload another image See more images
Barra Head Lighthouse	Barra Head	5 October 1971	56°47′08″N 7°39′13″W	Designed by Robert Stevenson and opened in 1833	5893	Upload another image See more images
Kisimul Castle	Castlebay, Barra	5 October 1971	56°57′07″N 7°29′15″W	16th-century castle on an island in Castle Bay	5901	Upload another image See more images
St Moluag's Church (Teampull Mholuaidh)	Eoropie, Lewis	25 March 1971	58°30′13″N 6°15′37″W	13th-century church	6603	Upload another image See more images
Amhuinnsuidhe Castle	Harris	5 October 1971	57°57′41″N 6°59′26″W	19th-century Scots baronial country house, designed by David Bryce	12767	Upload another image See more images
St Clement's Church	Rodel, Harris	5 October 1971	57°44′27″N 6°57′47″W	15th-century church	12912	Upload another image See more images
Eilean Glas Lighthouse	Scalpay	30 March 1994	57°51′25″N 6°38′31″W	The first lighthouse erected in the Western Isles, built 1789 by Thomas Smith	13487	Upload another image See more images
9 Locheport	Locheport, North Uist	5 October 1971	57°33′01″N 7°13′18″W	Hebridean-type thatched cottage	17570	Upload Photo
29 Locheport	Locheport, North Uist	5 October 1971	57°33′05″N 7°16′11″W	Hebridean-type thatched cottage	17571	Upload Photo
Struan Cottage	Malaclete, North Uist	15 January 1980	57°38′20″N 7°22′30″W	Hebridean-type thatched cottage	17582	Upload another image
Ardheisker thatched cottage	Ardheisker, North Uist	5 October 1971	57°34′47″N 7°24′56″W	Hebridean-type thatched cottage	17585	Upload Photo
Lews Castle	Stornoway, Lewis	25 March 1971	58°12′42″N 6°23′39″W	Mid 19th-century country house	18677	Upload another image See more images
472b South Lochboisdale	Lochboisdale, South Uist	15 January 1980	57°08′07″N 7°18′57″W	Skye-type thatched cottage	18746	Upload Photo
77 Ardmanonie	Eochar, South Uist	15 January 1980	57°23′27″N 7°22′23″W	Skye-type thatched cottage	18767	Upload Photo
Lews Castle Lodges, Boundary Walls, Sea Walls and Tower	Stornoway, Lewis	25 March 1971	58°12′36″N 6°23′30″W	19th-century walls around Lews Castle	19206	Upload Photo
St Columba's Church (Eye Church)	Aignish, Lewis	25 March 1971	58°12′26″N 6°17′00″W	Late medieval church, now partly ruined	19210	Upload another image
Bualadubh	Eochar, South Uist	15 January 1980	57°23′32″N 7°20′53″W	Skye-type thatched cottage	19908	Upload Photo
North Beach Quay/North Beach Old Sail Loft	North Beach, Stornoway, Lewis	25 March 1971	58°12′30″N 6°23′30″W	Large 19th-century warehouse with adjoining house	41735	Upload another image

== See also ==
- Scheduled monuments in the Outer Hebrides
