= Barra Head Lighthouse =

Lighthouse on the Outer Hebrides, Scotland

Barra Head Lighthouse Berneray
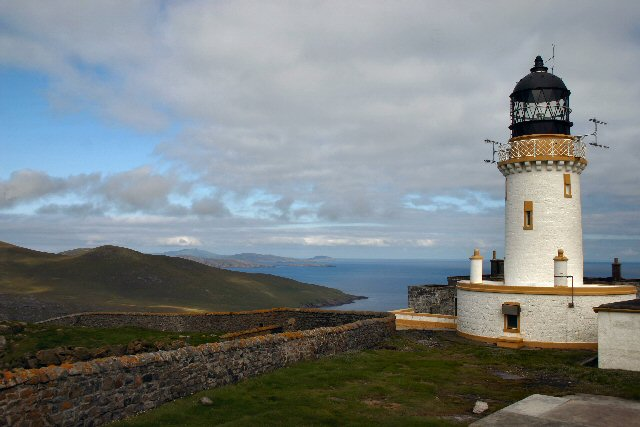
- The lighthouse in 2006
- Location: Barra Head; Outer Hebrides; Scotland
- OS grid: NL5646980399
- Coordinates: 56°47′08″N 7°39′13″W

Tower
- Constructed: 1833
- Built by: Robert Stevenson
- Construction: stone tower
- Automated: 23 October 1980
- Height: 18 m (59 ft)
- Shape: cylindrical tower with balcony and lantern attached to 1-storey keeper's house
- Markings: white tower, black lantern. ochre trim
- Operator: Northern Lighthouse Board
- Heritage: category A listed building

Light
- First lit: 15 October 1833
- Focal height: 208 m (682 ft)
- Lens: rotating fresnel lens
- Range: 18 nmi (33 km)
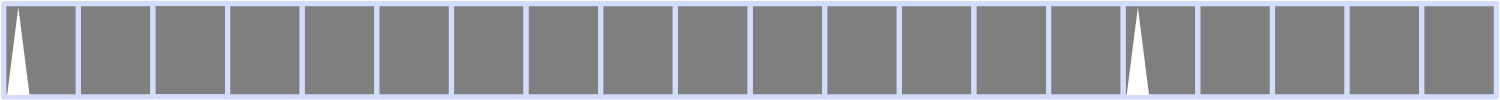
- Characteristic: Fl. W 15s 208m 18M (Fl.0,3 s - ec. 14.7s)

Barra Head Lighthouse on Barra Head identifies the southern entrance to The Minch, roughly halfway between the Eilean Glas and Rinns of Islay lighthouses. The 58-foot (18-metre) stone tower, built in 1833, stands on the west side of the island, at the top of a very steep cliff, making the light the highest in the UK with a focal plane of 208 m (682 ft) above sea level. It has a range of 18 nautical miles (21 mi; 33 km). There is no shallow water west of Berneray to break the blow of the Atlantic storms and small fish are sometimes thrown onto the grass on the cliff top. In 1836 Sir Archibald Geikie recorded the movement of a 42-long-ton (43-tonne) block of gneiss across 5 feet (1.5 m) of ground during a violent storm.

== History ==
Designed by Robert Stevenson and built by James Smith of Inverness the light was first exhibited on 15 October 1833. The oil-burning light was converted to incandescent in 1906 and the lighthouse was converted to automatic operation on 23 October 1980, when the last keepers were withdrawn.

The main optic is now an acetylene-operated Dalen revolving pedestal. The fresnel lens rotates every 30 seconds. During daylight hours, the lens rotates at a very slow speed to prevent the mantles from deteriorating in strong sunlight. There are 4 mantles in the exchanger systems. Electrical power is provided by batteries, which are automatically recharged by a diesel alternator twice a week. The equipment is monitored by Hyskeir Lighthouse.

Due to the dangerous landing conditions, Barra Head lighthouse was re-classified by the RNLI as a "Rock Station" early in the 20th century. Two small boats had been swamped and lost in the enormous swell by the slipway at the landing place. The regulations associated with this change prevented both alongside landings by tenders and the lighthouse men keeping dinghies onshore. The departure of the last of the crofting families meant an end to regular links by sea and the regular mist and fog rendered signalling unreliable. A system of wireless communications with Castlebay on Barra was therefore proposed and installed by 1925.

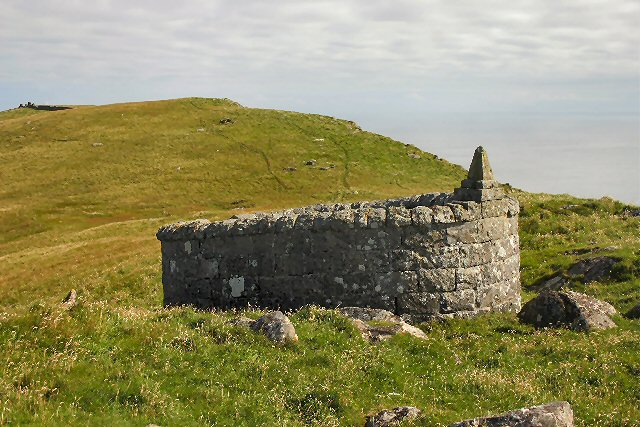
The keepers' cemetery

The pier was built in the late 1930s with the approach of war, when a sophisticated radar system was installed to guard the Western Approaches. This involved the landing of hundreds of steel girders and drums containing steel cables used to create three large radar masts, and a robust "Scots Derrick" was erected to crane them ashore.

A small walled cemetery was constructed halfway between the lighthouse and the summit of Sotan for the keepers. This contains the grave of a visiting inspector and those of a number of the keepers' children. A Blenheim bomber crashed into the cliffs nearby during World War II, but the wreck was not discovered until many years later by a rock climber.

== See also ==
- List of lighthouses in Scotland
- List of Northern Lighthouse Board lighthouses
- List of Category A listed buildings in the Western Isles

== Bibliography ==
- Buxton, Ben (1995) Mingulay: An Island and Its People. Edinburgh: Birlinn. ISBN 1-874744-24-6
- Haswell-Smith, Hamish (2004). The Scottish Islands. Edinburgh: Canongate. ISBN 978-1-84195-454-7.
- Munro, R.W. (1979) Scottish Lighthouses. Stornoway: Thule Press. ISBN 0 906191 32 7 (Available online at The Internet Archive. Retrieved 24 December 2025.)
- Murray, W.H. (1966) The Hebrides. London: Heinemann. OCLC 4998389
