= Scheduled monuments in the Outer Hebrides =

Outer Hebrides shown within Scotland

A scheduled monument in Scotland is a nationally important archaeological site or monument which is given legal protection by being placed on a list (or "schedule") maintained by Historic Environment Scotland. The aim of scheduling is to preserve the country's most significant sites and monuments as far as possible in the form in which they have been inherited.

The process of scheduling is governed by the Ancient Monuments and Archaeological Areas Act 1979, which aims "to make provision for the investigation, preservation and recording of matters of archaeological or historical interest". The term "scheduled monument" can apply to the whole range of archaeological sites which have been deliberately constructed by human activity but are not always visible above ground. They range from prehistoric standing stones and burial sites, through Roman remains and medieval structures such as castles and monasteries, to later structures such as industrial sites and buildings constructed for the World Wars. Some buildings or structures which were both scheduled and listed have had their listing designations removed to reduce the duplication.

In 2017 there were 8238 scheduled monuments in Scotland.

== Notable scheduled monuments in the Outer Hebrides ==
Name	Location	Description	Ref No	Image
Barpa Langass	North Uist	Chambered cairn	SM892	
Clach an Trushal	Isle of Lewis	Standing stone	SM1661	
Dun Carloway	Isle of Lewis	Broch	SM90110	
Eilean Dòmhnuill	North Uist	Possible crannog	SM5238	
Loch na Berie	Isle of Lewis	Broch	SM5798	

== See also ==
- List of Category A listed buildings in the Western Isles
