= Barra Head =

Southernmost island of the Outer Hebrides in Scotland

Beàrnaraigh (Gaelic)
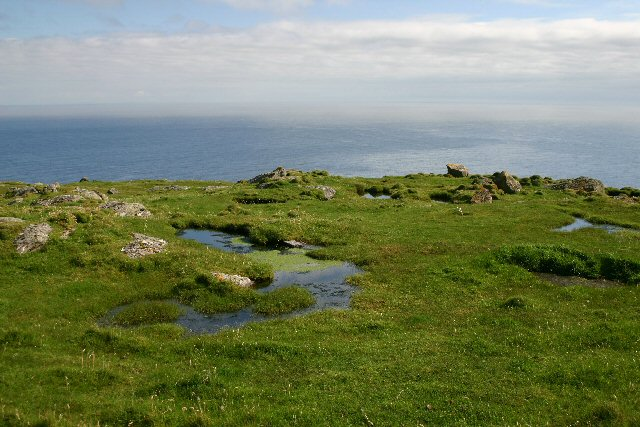

Location
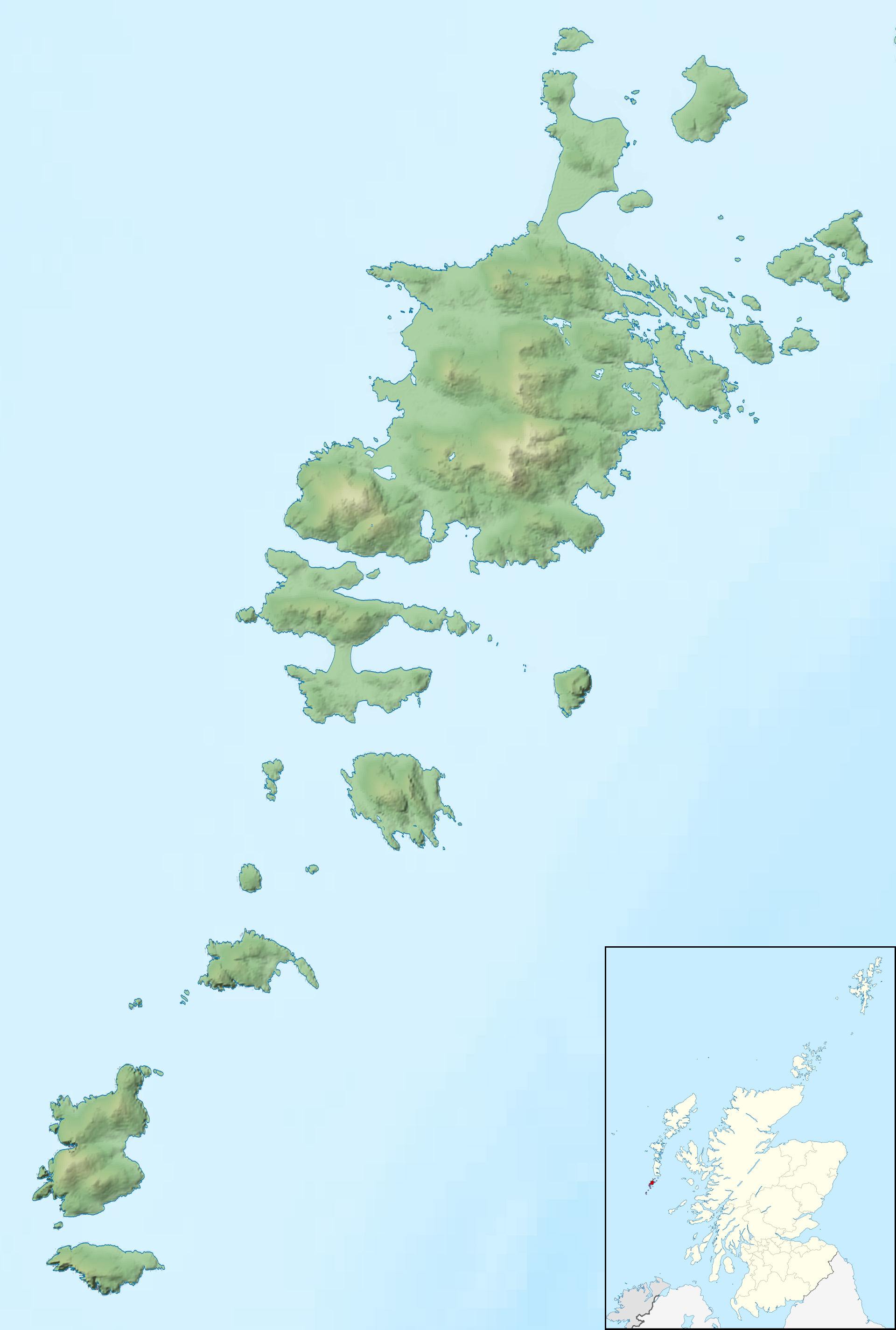
- Barra Head shown in the Barra Isles Barra Head shown within the Outer Hebrides
- OS grid reference: NL553799
- Coordinates: 56.783°N 7.645°W

Name
- Name meaning: Old Norse for "Bjørn's island"
- Old Norse name: Bjarnaray

Physical geography
- Island group: Uist and Barra
- Area: 204 ha (3/4 sq mi)
- Area rank: 107
- Highest elevation: Sotan, 193 m (633 ft)

Administration
- Council area: Outer Hebrides
- Country: Scotland
- Sovereign state: United Kingdom

Demographics
- Population: 0

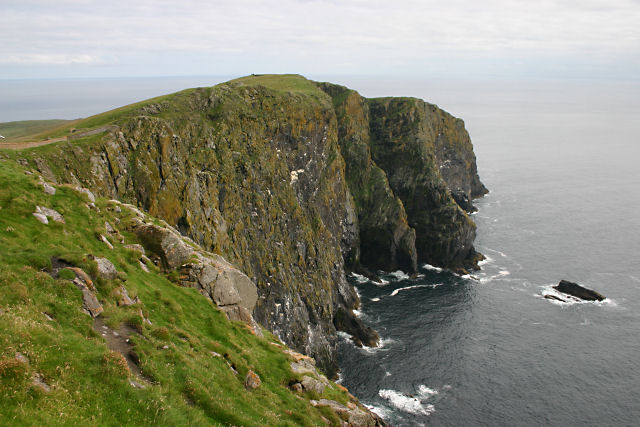
Barra Head, Berneray.

Barra Head, also known as Berneray (Scottish Gaelic: Beàrnaraigh), is the southernmost island of the Outer Hebrides in Scotland. Within the Outer Hebrides, it forms part of the Barra Isles archipelago. Originally, Barra Head only referred to the southernmost headland of Berneray but is now a common name for the entire island. The highest point of the island is Sotan, a Marilyn.

There are numerous prehistoric structures on the island and permanent occupation by 20–50 individuals occurred throughout the historic period, peaking in the 19th century. The economy of the residents was based on agriculture, fishing and fowling. The cliffs provide nesting sites for seabirds in such profusion that Berneray has been designated as a Special Protection Area.

The Barra Head Lighthouse, designed by Robert Stevenson, has operated since 1833. From 1931 to 1980 Barra Head was inhabited only by the lighthouse keepers and their wives but the lighthouse is now automated and the island completely uninhabited. The rough seas that surround the island have been used to test prototype lifeboats.

== Etymology ==
The derivation of the modern name is straightforward, the Old Norse name meaning "Bjorn's island" becoming Beàrnaraigh in Gaelic and then "Berneray" as an anglicisation. However, as is often the case with Hebridean island names, there are a number of additional complications. There are two fuller Gaelic names – Beàrnaraigh Cheann Bharraigh and Beàrnaraigh an Easbaig meaning "Berneray of Barra Head" and "Berneray of the Bishop" respectively. The former refers to Barra Head the southernmost promontory of the island and the latter name is a reference to the "Bishop's Isles" an alternative name for the "Barra Isles", of which archipelago Berneray is a member. "Barra Head" alone is an English language alternative to Berneray for the island name. The Inverness-shire Ordnance Survey Name Book, volume 2, of 1876–1878, notes that "The Island of Berneray is sometimes called Barra Head but Berneray is the correct designation."

== Geography and geology ==
Berneray lies to the west of the Sea of the Hebrides and south of Mingulay across the Sound of Berneray, which has a strong tidal stream. The wedge-shaped island is 3 kilometres (1 3/4 miles) long and 1.3 km (3/4 mi) wide. The topography lacks variety, there being no valley or bays and the few streams are very small. Most of the island consists of gneiss, although the lighthouse was constructed of rock from a small granite quarry.

The seabed to the west is a continuation of the gneiss platform with a depth of between 120 and 140 metres (390 and 460 ft). The sea floor is largely devoid of sand and there is some evidence of scouring by icebergs. This rocky platform extends south of Barra Head by at least 50 km (30 mi). Due to glacial action the sea channel to the east is significantly deeper than the open ocean to the west, reaching up to 365 m (1,198 ft).

The rocky north coast has a small landing place at Leac na Fealia to the west and a small jetty at Achduin further east. From there a track leads westward and upward across the slope of the island to the lighthouse. To the west of Achduin the land is relatively flat and low-lying, the area known as "The Aird" ending at Nisam Point which overlooks the little islands of Rubha Niosaim and Sgeir Mhor.

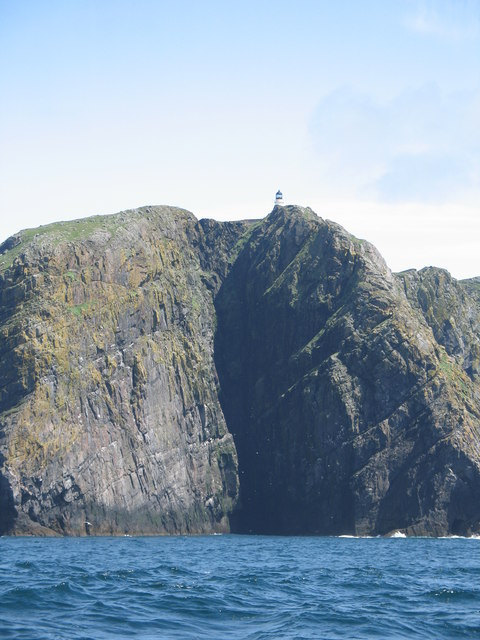
The lighthouse atop the cliffs of Sloc na Bèiste

The south coast is dominated by high cliffs, which rise to 190 m (620 ft) at Skate Point (Rubha Sgait) in the south west. Barra Head itself is the southern prominence located mid-way along the south coast. The highest point of the island is Sotan, a Marilyn whose summit lies above high cliffs between Barra Head and Skate Point. This eminence is easily reached from the track that leads from Achduin to the lighthouse that passes just to the north of the summit, which is only 3 m (10 ft) from the cliff edge. The skerry of Bird Rock guards the coast far below. The lighthouse is located near the prominence of Sròn an Duin, just east of Skate Point and above the narrow chasm of Sloc na Bèiste (ravine of the monster).

Visiting in 1868 H. J. Elwes wrote:

It was the grandest sight I ever experienced, to look out of the lighthouse on a very stormy day, and see oneself hanging, as it were, over the ocean, surrounded on three sides by a fearful chasm in which the air was so thickly crowded with birds as to produce the appearance of a heavy snowstorm, whilst the cries of these myriads, mingled with the roar of the ocean and the howling of the tremendous gusts of wind coming up from below as if forced through a blast pipe, made it almost impossible to hear a person speak.

== History ==
Berneray was inhabited from prehistoric times until the 20th century; Historic Scotland have identified eighty-three archaeological sites on the island, the majority being of a pre-medieval date. There are four chambered tombs, five cists and five other sites assumed to be burial cairns, suggesting a significant settlement in the Neolithic and Bronze Age. The fort of Dùn Briste (the broken fort) lies to the north west and a second site nearby dating to the Iron Age was largely destroyed during the construction of the lighthouse. Visiting in the late 17th century the writer Martin Martin described the latter as "having a vacuity round the walls, divided in little apartments". A century later Edward MacQueen wrote that he believed it had served "as a pharos or watch tower".

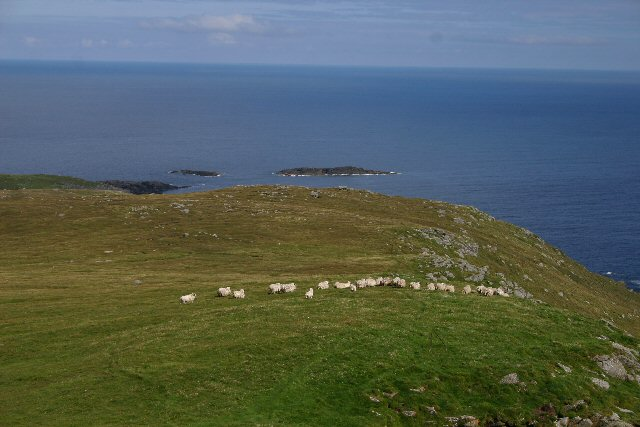
From Rubha Cuabhaig looking towards Sgeir Mhòr

There is also the presumed site of a chapel near MacLean's Point (just east of the landing place) where an incised cross, tentatively dated to between the sixth and ninth centuries was found. Archaeological evidence of the Norse presence in the Hebrides is scant, but boat shaped stone settings found not far from the chapel may be graves from this period of occupation.

Referring to his own time, Martin suggested that life on "Bernera" was not unduly difficult. "It excels other islands of the same extent for cultivation and fishing. The natives never go a fishing while Macneil or his steward is in the island, lest seeing their plenty of fish, perhaps they might take occasion to raise their rents." In the 18th century the population was over fifty, with settlement concentrated around the north east coast. The 1841 census recorded a population of 30, rising to 56 in 1881 and then declining again to 36 in nine houses by 1891. During the 19th century the permanently resident population (see below) remained stable at about 20 in two or three families. The number fell to 17 by 1901, with the last native islanders leaving about 1910. From this point the three families of the lighthouse keepers were the only residents and the island became uninhabited with the 1980 automation of the light.

=== Overview of population trends ===
Year	Population (a)	Population (b)
1764	20	
1794	3 families	
1841	21	30
1851	28	44
1861	20	33

Year	Population (a)	Population (b)
1871	20	38
1881	21	56
1891	17	36
1901	–	17
1911	0	5

Notes:

Population (a) includes permanent residents only and was not recorded in 1901.
Population (b) also includes lighthouse keepers and, given that many of the censuses were taken in April, temporarily resident fishermen.

== Traditional economy and culture ==
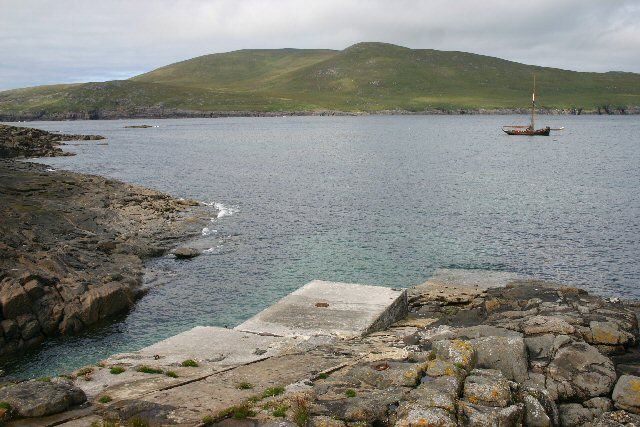
The jetty at Achduin with Mingulay beyond

During the 19th century agriculture was based on crops of barley, potatoes, oats, turnips and cabbages and livestock including sheep and cattle. Ponies were kept, although their use may have been to transport materials to the lighthouse, and goats were also recorded in 1863. Berneray lacks peat, which had to be brought over from Mingulay at considerable effort. The harvest of the seas remained important, with the island a base for exploiting the rich stocks of white fish by fishermen from several local islands. Seabirds were also an important part of the economy, supplying both food and feathers for sale. Such was the abundance that in 1868 a single fowler caught 600 birds in six to eight hours.

Visiting in 1818, William MacGillivray, professor of Natural History at Aberdeen University wrote:

On reaching Berneray we landed and soon after betook ourselves to a hut which we found cleared for our reception. We dined on roasted mutton, wild fowls' eggs, bread, butter and whisky. The goodman of the house came home with a basketful of eggs from the rocks, and some birds he had caught.

The travel writer Isabella Bird arrived in 1863 aboard the Shamrock receiving an "outrageous welcome" from the islanders, despite the fact that amongst the Gaelic-speaking locals only a few had "some very lame sentences in English". She wrote approvingly that her hosts were "well-dressed, cleanly and healthy looking" and of the "delicious cream, in large clean, wooden bowls." Duncan Sinclair, the only Protestant on the island purchased a Bible and there was much bartering and bargaining with the islanders paying for their purchases in dried fish. Bird concluded that the island was:

Far out into the Atlantic, exposed to its fullest fury, and generally inaccessible, yet has nursed a population before, rather than behind, those of the other Hebrides. Without any advantages or other religious ordinances than are supplied by the annual visit of a priest from Barra, these very interesting people thirst for education, and would make considerable sacrifices to obtain it.

In 1851 several of the island's children were described as "scholars at home" and later some youngsters attended the school on Mingulay. The Barra School Board created a "sub-school" on Berneray but it can never have had even as many as ten children in attendance and it closed in 1887 after a few years of operation.

== Lighthouse ==
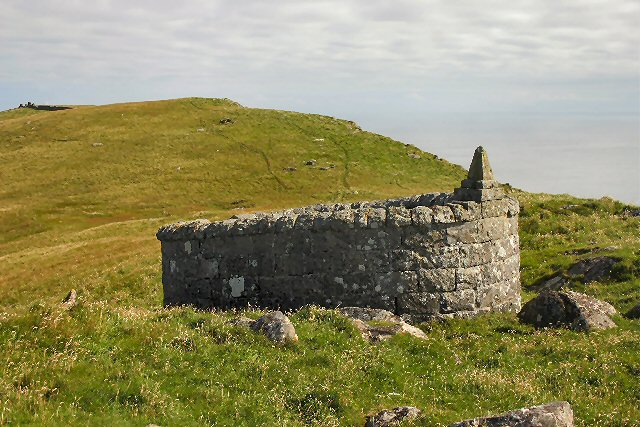
The keepers' cemetery

Barra Head Lighthouse identifies the southern entrance to The Minch, roughly halfway between the Eilean Glas and Rinns of Islay lighthouses. The 58-foot (18-metre) stone tower stands on the west side of the island, at the top of a very steep cliff, making the light 693 ft (211 m) above sea level, with a range of 18 nmi (33 km). There is no shallow water west of Berneray to break the blow of the Atlantic storms and small fish are sometimes thrown onto the grass on the cliff top. In 1836 Sir Archibald Geikie recorded the movement of a 42-long-ton (43-tonne) block of gneiss across 5 feet (1.5 m) of ground during a violent storm.

Designed by Robert Stevenson and built by James Smith of Inverness the light was first exhibited on 15 October 1833. The oil-burning light was converted to incandescent in 1906 and the lighthouse was converted to automatic operation on 23 October 1980, when the last keepers were withdrawn.

Due to the dangerous landing conditions, Barra Head lighthouse was re-classified by the RNLI as a "Rock Station" early in the 20th century. Two small boats had been swamped and lost in the enormous swell by the slipway at the landing place. The regulations associated with this change prevented both alongside landings by tenders and the lighthouse men keeping dinghies onshore. The departure of the last of the crofting families meant an end to regular links by sea and the regular mist and fog rendered signalling unreliable. A system of wireless communications with Castlebay on Barra was therefore proposed and installed by 1925.

The pier was built in the late 1930s with the approach of war, when a sophisticated radar system was installed to guard the Western Approaches. This involved the landing of hundreds of steel girders and drums containing steel cables used to create three large radar masts, and a robust "Scots Derrick" was erected to crane them ashore. A small walled cemetery was constructed halfway between the lighthouse and the summit of Sotan for the keepers. This contains the grave of a visiting inspector and those of a number of the keepers' children. A Blenheim bomber crashed into the cliffs nearby during World War II, but the wreck was not discovered until many years later by a rock climber.

== Lifeboats ==
In the early 1970s a research project sponsored by BP into a prototype safety boat for Barra Head also assisted the RNLI in developing the Atlantic 21 class lifeboat. The boat used was a Halmatic Atlantic 21 MKIII modified for long-range operations and with full offshore capability. The project involved multi-organisation co-operation and included Halmatic themselves, HM Coastguard and the Royal Marines Amphibious Trials and Testing Unit.

In 2008 the Barra RNLI Life Boat, Edna Windsor was featured on a series of Royal Mail stamps. The first class stamp shows the 17-metre (56-foot) Severn class lifeboat in action in the Sound of Berneray 20 km (12 mi) south west of Barra in a 3.5-metre (11 ft) swell and a 30 km/h (16 kn) wind.

== Natural history ==
Sotan

Highest point
- Elevation: 193 m (633 ft)
- Prominence: 193 m (633 ft)
- Listing: Marilyn
- Coordinates: 56°47′0″N 7°38′41″W

Geography
- Location: Barra Isles, Outer Hebrides, Scotland
- OS grid: NL553799
- Topo map: OS Landranger 31

The National Trust for Scotland purchased the island in 2000 from a local crofters' syndicate called the Barra Head Isles Sheepstock Company who had owned the island since 1955. The NTS were able to acquire it through a bequest by Miss J. M. Fawcitt "to provide an area of natural beauty in memory of her parents and the courage of her late brother, Bernard". In 2009 the NTS removed all the sheep from the island, citing the difficulties of maintaining the flock in such a remote location.

Berneray and Mingulay form an important breeding site for around a hundred thousand pairs of seabirds, and are especially important for the razorbill, the two islands having at least 2.0% of the UK's breeding population in 1985. Other species present include a variety of gulls, guillemots, puffins, kittiwakes, shags and (since 1899) fulmars. The island is largely covered by maritime grassland, with some machair and heath. Primrose, violets, yellow flag iris and celandine grow abundantly and grey seals are regularly seen by the landing cove. The island is designated as an SSSI and (with Mingulay) is a Special Protection Area.

=== Important Bird Area ===
The island (along with neighbouring Mingulay) has been designated an Important Bird Area (IBA) by BirdLife International because it supports breeding populations of several species of seabirds.

== Notable residents ==
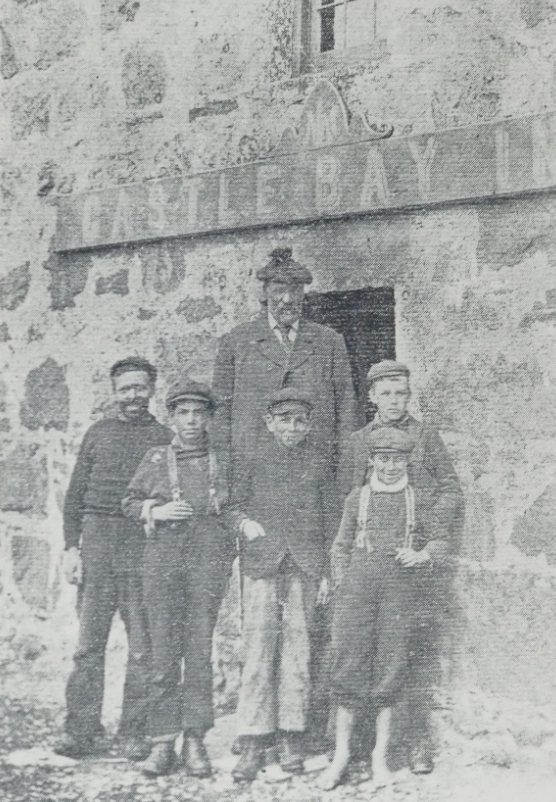
Pàdraig Mòr, the "Barra Giant", outside the Castlebay Inn

The island's best known former resident is Peter Sinclair, aka Pàdraig Mòr or the "Barra Giant". He was measured at 2.03 m (6 ft 8 in) tall aged seventeen in 1866. He joined a travelling show, but disliked the publicity and returned to the islands to run a dairy in Castlebay in the summer and spend the winters at his home on Berneray.
