= Butt of Lewis Lighthouse =

Butt of Lewis Lighthouse Rubha Robhanais
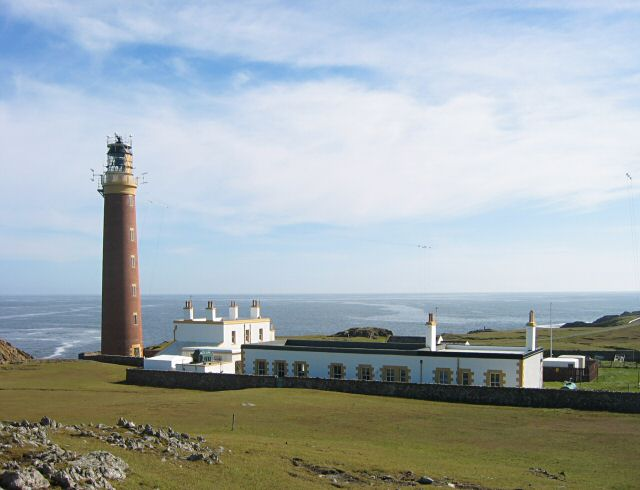
- Butt of Lewis Lighthouse
- Location: Butt of Lewis; Lewis; Outer Hebrides; Scotland
- OS grid: NB5197066483
- Coordinates: 58°30′55.7″N 6°15′39.2″W

Tower
- Constructed: 1862
- Built by: David Stevenson
- Construction: brick tower
- Automated: 1998
- Height: 37 metres (121 ft)
- Shape: tapered cylindrical tower with balcony and lantern
- Markings: brick unpainted tower, black lantern, ochre trim
- Operator: Northern Lighthouse Board
- Heritage: category A listed building

Light
- Focal height: 52 metres (171 ft)
- Range: 25 nautical miles (46 km; 29 mi)
- Characteristic: Fl W 5s.

Butt of Lewis Lighthouse, designed by David Stevenson, was built at Butt of Lewis to aid shipping in the 1860s. Unusual for a lighthouse in Scotland, it is constructed of red brick, and is unpainted. The station was automated in 1998, one of the last to be converted. A modern differential GPS base station has now been sited on a nearby hill to further aid navigation. This hill was also the site for a Lloyd's Signal Station from the 1890s.

The road to the lighthouse passes a sheltered cove called Port Stoth. Agricultural lazy beds are also visible along the coast. The Butt of Lewis features some of the oldest rocks in Europe, having been formed in the Precambrian period up to 3 billion years ago. Following the coast southwest from the lighthouse there is a natural arch called the "Eye of the Butt" (Scottish Gaelic: Toll a’ Ròigh). It can be best viewed from the Habost machair.

== See also ==
- List of lighthouses in Scotland
- List of Northern Lighthouse Board lighthouses
- List of Category A listed buildings in the Western Isles
