= Port Stoth =

Sheltered inlet in the Outer Hebrides, Scotland

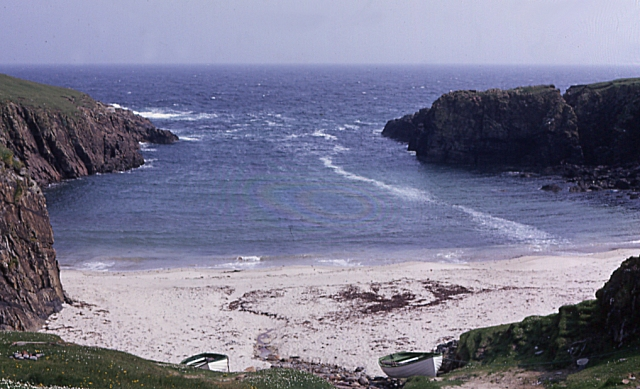

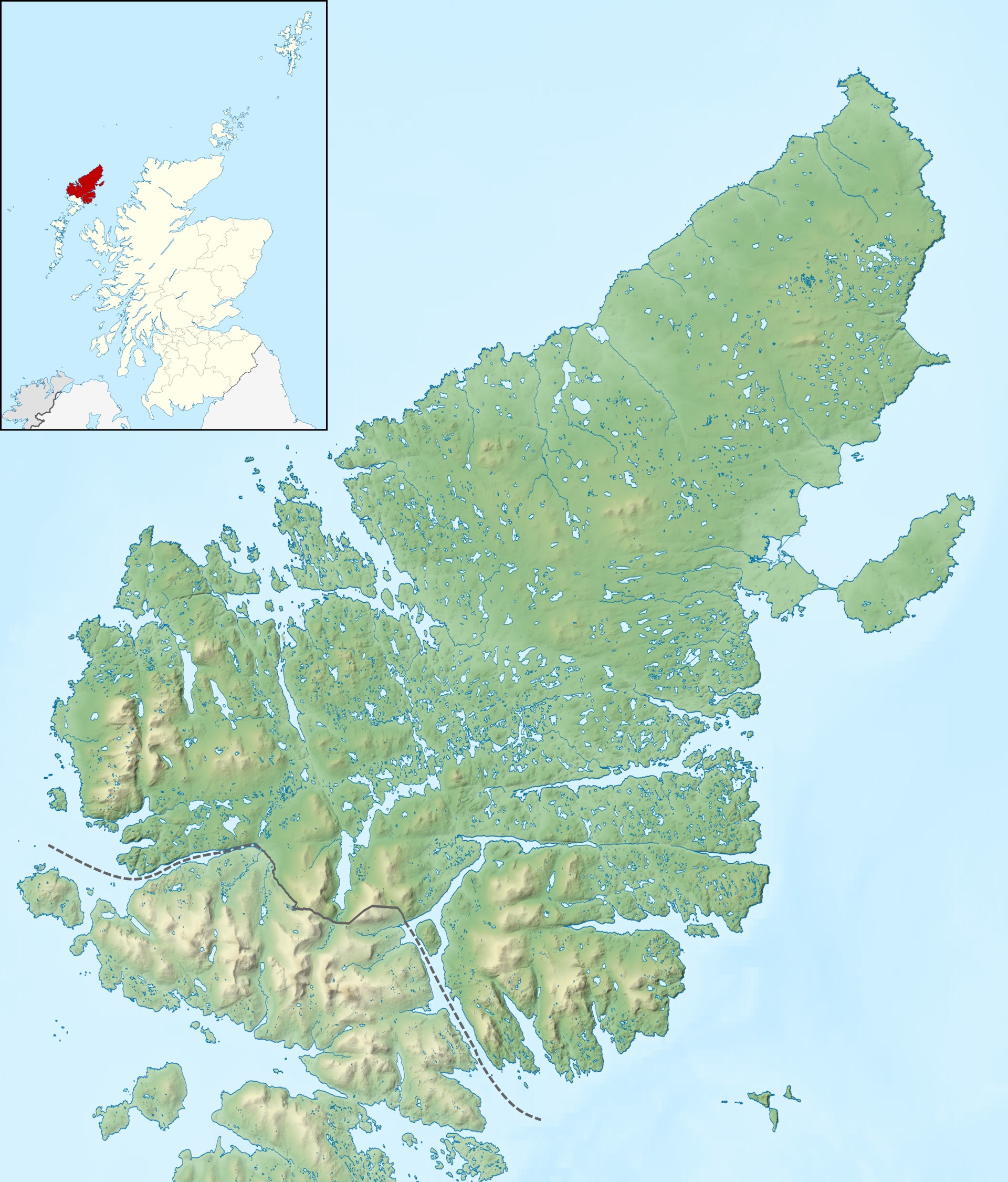
- Location on the Isle of Lewis
- Location: Isle of Lewis, Scotland, UK; Grid Reference NB524659
- Coordinates: 58.510701°N 6.251169°W

Port Stoth, known locally as Stoth and pronounced Stow, is a sheltered inlet just southeast of the Butt of Lewis in the Outer Hebrides, Scotland. It is the most northerly landing in the Outer Hebrides. A track leads down to a slipway which runs across the sandy beach.

Port Stoth is about 400 yards (370 m) from the Butt of Lewis Lighthouse. All the materials for the construction of the lighthouse (between 1859 and 1862) were brought by ship and landed in Port Stoth, due to lack of road infrastructure. The port continued to play an important role in bringing supplies to the lighthouse until about 1960. Supplies and fuel were brought in small cargo vessels when the weather allowed, and were unloaded in Port Stoth by crane. The concrete base still remains, as does a brick storage building.

There is a brick building to the North side of Stoth where shellfish was landed and there are the remains of a hoist fixed to the shore below.

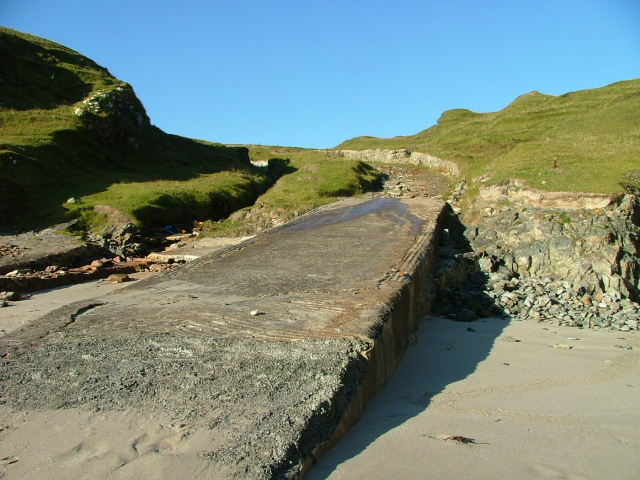
Slipway onto the beach

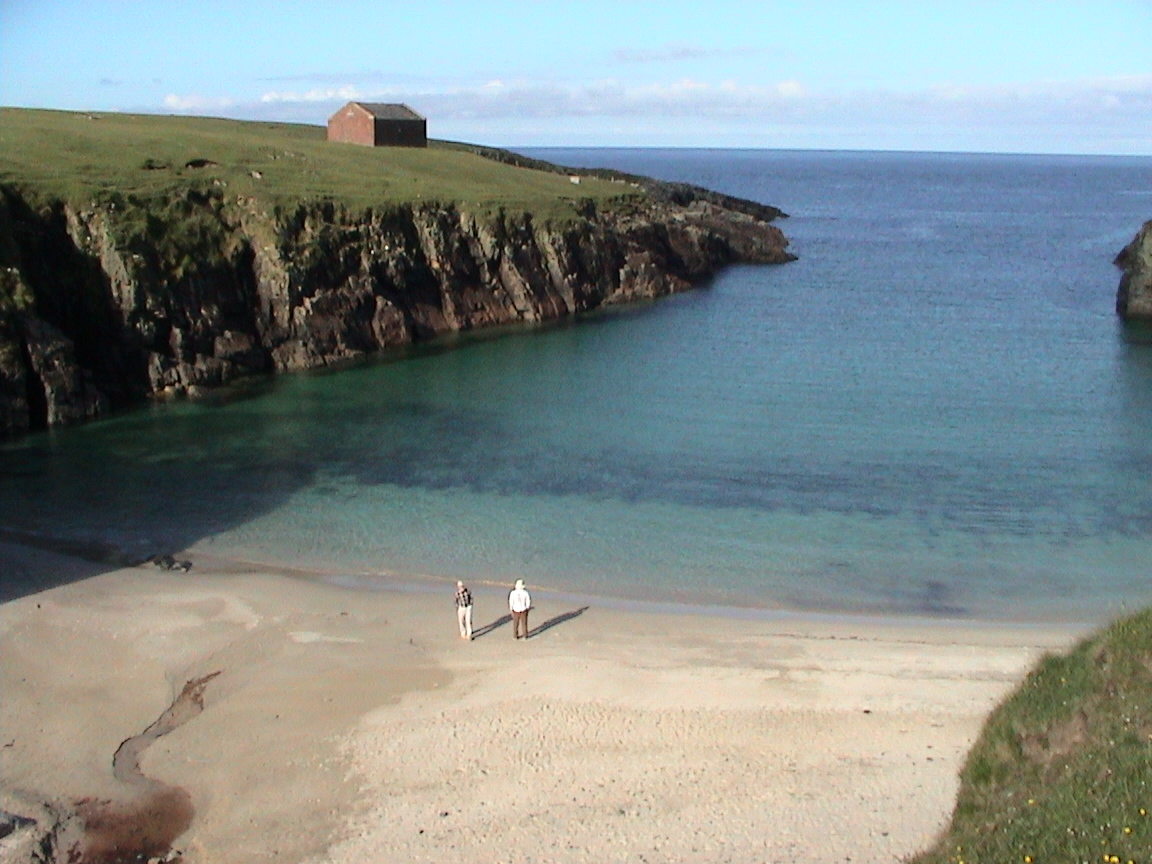
View showing brick storage building

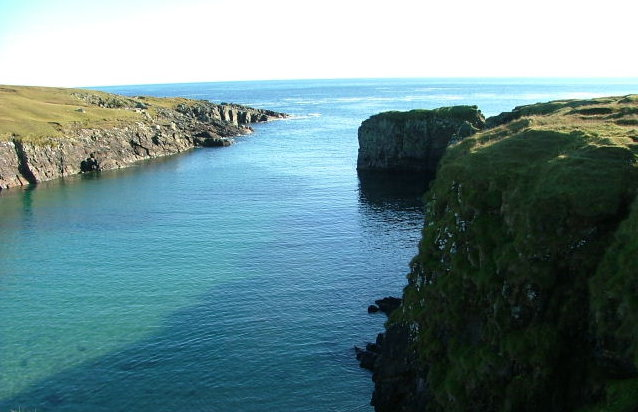
View from the cliff top

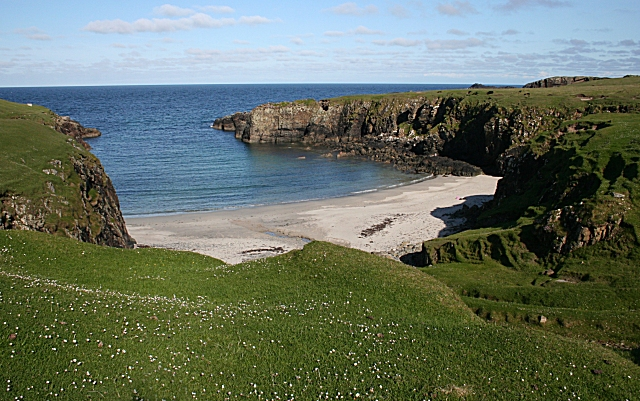
View from north of the track
