= Scarp, Scotland =

Island in Outer Hebrides, Scotland

Scarp
An Sgarp (Gaelic)
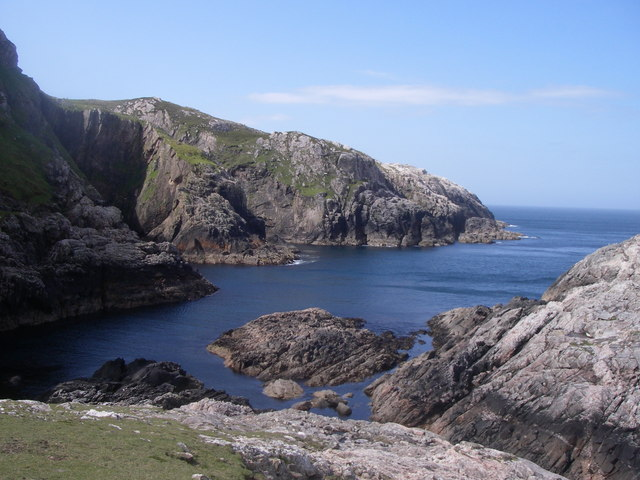
- North coast of Scarp with view to the west

Location
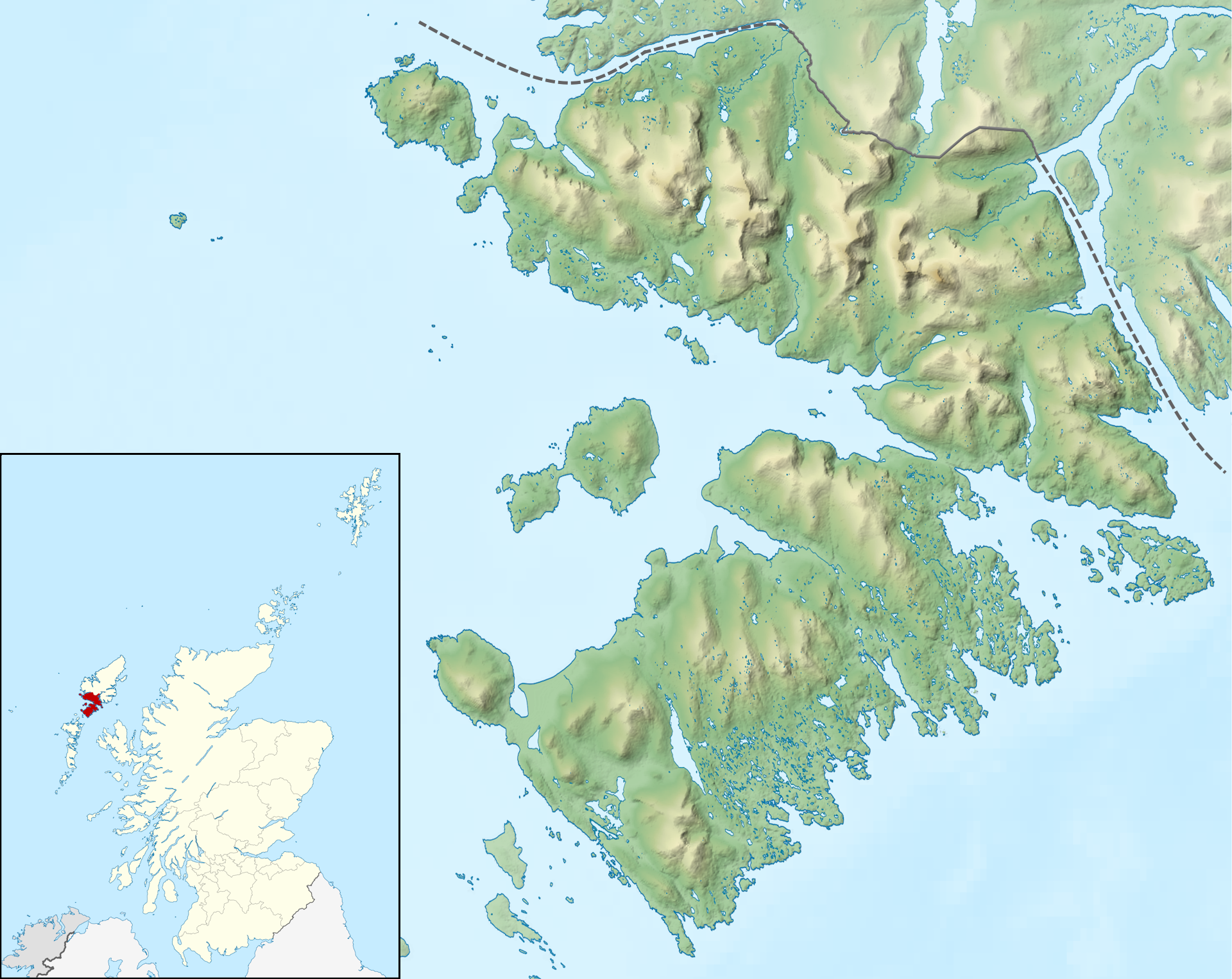
- Scarp shown next to Harris Scarp shown within the Outer Hebrides
- OS grid reference: NA970151
- Coordinates: 58.03°N 7.12°W

Name
- Name meaning: "Barren", from Norse

Physical geography
- Island group: Harris and Lewis
- Area: 1,045 ha (4 sq mi)
- Area rank: 48
- Highest elevation: Sròn Romul 308 m (1,010 ft)

Administration
- Council area: Western Isles
- Country: Scotland
- Sovereign state: United Kingdom

Demographics
- Population: 0

Scarp (Scottish Gaelic: An Sgarp) is an uninhabited island in the Outer Hebrides of Scotland, west of Hushinish on Harris. Once inhabited, the island was the scene of unsuccessful experiments with rocket mail, since commemorated in two films.

== Geography ==
Scarp has an area of 1,045 hectares (2,582 acres), divided into 16 crofts. The majority of the land is rocky and uncultivated, and is dominated by two hills, of which the higher reaches 308 metres (1,010 feet). There is a small area of low-lying fertile land in the south-east corner of the island, and here, closest to Harris, is where the inhabitants of the island once lived. The population of Scarp peaked at 213 in 1881, and as recently as the 1940s it was reported to be over 100. The island was settled by eight farming families in 1810, and the population rose, following clearances on Harris, to over two hundred. This population could not be supported as there is little cultivatable land and no all-weather harbour, resulting in many families drifting away. Even in the 1950s the economy was still basic, relying on potatoes, cabbages, oats, turnips, milk, fish, and some lobster fishing. Scarp was one of several Scottish islands, including St Kilda and Handa, where all the men of the island would gather every morning in a so-called "parliament", to agree the work to be done on that day. Such meetings would sometimes last for many hours, and on these occasions no work would be done, except by the women of the island.

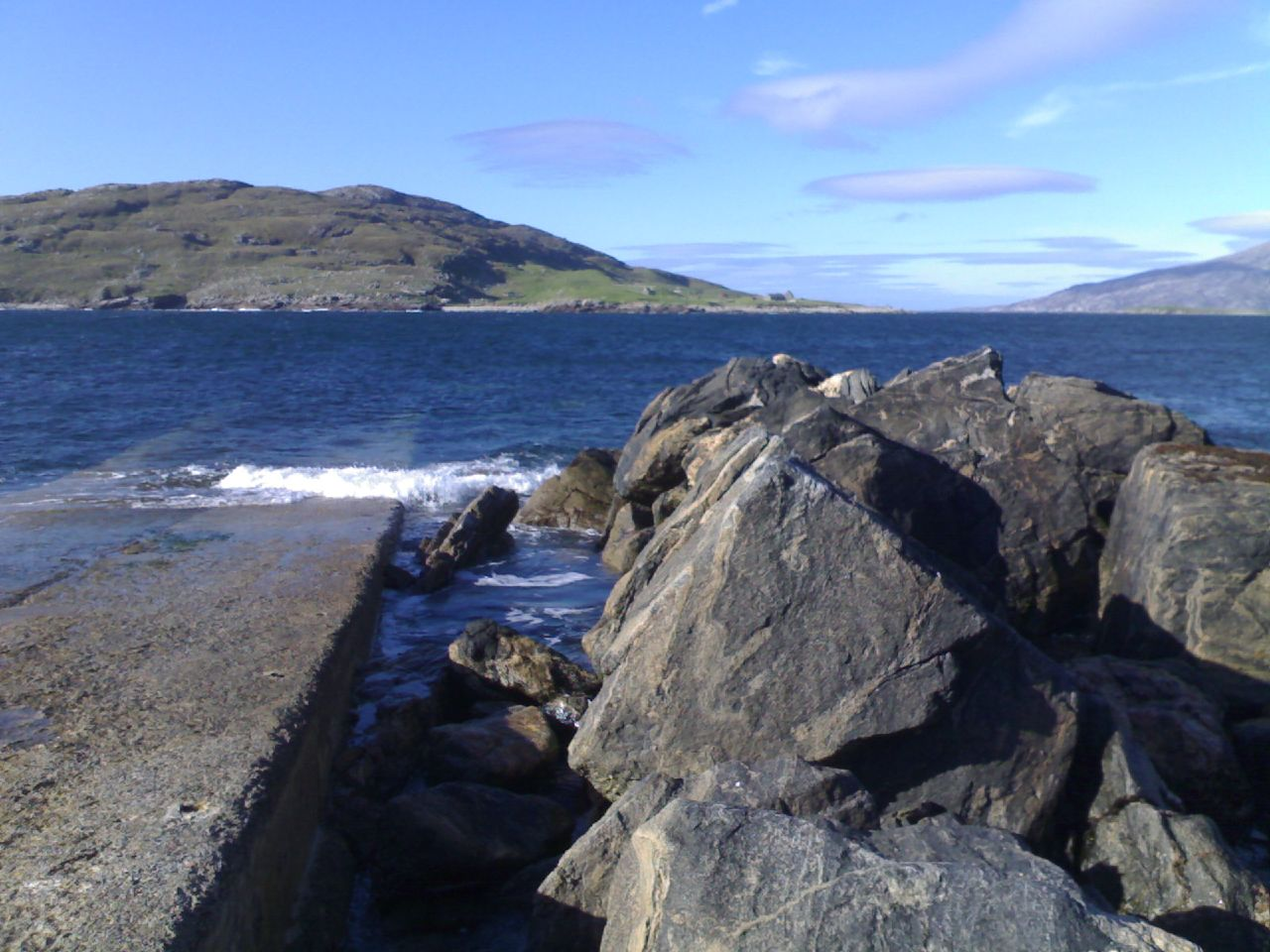
Looking across to Scarp from the Hushinish slipway

Crofting was the way of life on the island, mainly comprising sheep and dairy cattle rearing and fishing, in latter years principally lobster fishing, which provided an income for around 12 families.

Islanders were deeply religious and a Church of Scotland Mission House was the focal point for Sunday worship and weekly prayer meetings.

The 1950s and 1960s saw a further decline in the island's population. The closure of the primary school in 1967 and the post office in 1968 were final blows and by the time of the 1971 census the population had dwindled to 12. By the end of 1971, the last permanent inhabitants of Scarp had moved to Harris. However, a few houses on the island are still in occasional use as private holiday homes.

== Communication ==
The island is reached by a short boat crossing across the Kyle of Scarp from Hushinish, but the sea here is very shallow and landing on Scarp can be difficult when there is a swell.

Scarp was the site of an experiment by German inventor Gerhard Zucker to deliver the island's post by rocket mail. In July 1934 Zucker made two unsuccessful attempts at firing rocket mail between Scarp and Harris. Singed envelopes from the exploded rocket can still be seen at the island museum.

== Media and the arts ==
A fictionalised account of the rocket mail experiment was used as the basis of the film, The Rocket Post, filmed on Harris and Taransay and directed by Stephen Whittaker, which was finally released in 2006. The film was originally intended to be filmed on location on Scarp but the owner later refused permission and location was moved to Taransay.

The artist Norman Adams bought a croft house on the island in 1963 with his wife Anna and two sons, and painted many of his well-known works there in his distinctive style over the next ten summers.

There are many references to the grave of Donald John MacLennan, who is buried at Scarp Burial Ground, in the book Not Forgotten (2006) by author Neil Oliver. Donald John died on 18 March 1917 when his ship PS Duchess of Montrose struck a mine and was lost near Dunkirk during the First World War.

== Ownership ==
Scarp was bought by a Panamanian company for £100 in 1978 as a speculation, sold in 1983 for £50,000 to Libco Ltd, then resold almost immediately to Orbitglen Ltd for £500,000. The last two deals were financed by the now-failed BCCI bank. Nazmudin Virani, a Ugandan businessman who was a director of BCCI, brokered the deals. Virani was jailed for fraud and when BCCI collapsed the property was resold in 1995 for £155,000 to Mr Anderson Duke Bakewell who is the current owner.

== See also ==
- List of islands of Scotland

== Bibliography ==
- Adams, Anna. Island Chapters.
- Duncan, Angus (2005). Hebridean Island: Memories of Scarp. Birlinn. ISBN 1-84158-394-4.
- Haswell-Smith, Hamish (2004). The Scottish Islands. Edinburgh: Canongate. ISBN 978-1-84195-454-7.
- Mac an Tàilleir, Iain (2003) Goireasan Cànain / Language Resources - Tadhail is Ionnsaich : Pàrlamaid na h-Alba. (pdf) Pàrlamaid na h-Alba. Retrieved 26 October 2025.
