= Hebridean Whale and Dolphin Trust =

Scottish Marine Conservation Charity

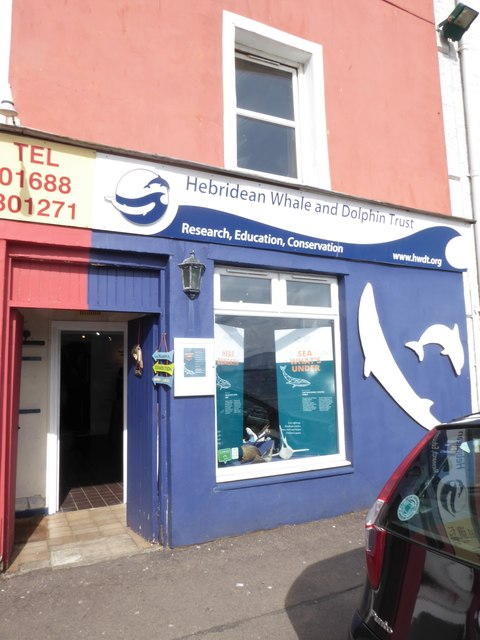
Office of the trust

The Hebridean Whale and Dolphin Trust (also known as HWDT) is a marine conservation charity in the Hebrides, Scotland that is dedicated to research and education of whales, dolphins and porpoises (Cetaceans) in Hebridean waters. It is based in Tobermory on the Isle of Mull although it works across the whole of the West Coast of Scotland.

== History ==
HWDT was founded in 1994 off the back of the UK's first whale-watching operator, with the goal of further understanding the rich diversity of whales and dolphins in Scottish waters.

== Work ==
HWDT works 'directly with local communities to ensure whales, dolphins and porpoises are protected and valued throughout Scotland's west coast.' Much of their data is collected through citizen science from members of the public as well as local boat tour operators and fishermen. Data they have collected has contributed to creating Marine Protected Areas (MPA) for Minke whales, Risso's dolphins and basking sharks, and a Special Area of Conservation (SAC) for harbour porpoises in Scottish waters.

=== Whale Track ===
In 2017, HWDT launched a free app called Whale Track allowing a community of both locals and tourists to the Hebrides to report their sightings to the Trust. Designed to function without phone signal or Wi-Fi, the app allows the Trust to collect data daily from sightings around the Hebrides. The data is also visible to other users allowing the community to know what species are being seen in their local area and encouraging them to report. Data from this has contributed to creating MPAs in the Hebrides as well as increasing the knowledge about what species visit Scottish waters.

=== Silurian ===
In 2002, the Trust bought a research vessel named Silurian to help them survey and collect data about the Hebridean Seas. The 60 ft ketch had previously been used in the Azores to film the first series of BBC's The Blue Planet. Silurian has collected data for the trust every year since 2002, staffed by paying volunteers and crew. In this time, she has sailed over 100,000 km, recorded 15 species as well as collecting over a year's worth of underwater acoustic recordings via hydrophone.

Silurian also operates as a floating classroom taking on schoolchildren to teach them about marine research and the marine life in Scottish waters.

The Trust also use Silurian to monitor the impact of military activities on the local marine mammals during the bi-annual Joint Warrior military exercise that take place in north-west Scotland.

=== Hebridean Whale Centre ===
In 1997, a discovery centre was opened in Tobermory, in order to increase the public engagement of the charity and educate both locals and tourists about Scottish cetaceans.

It currently operates as an interactive visitor centre on Tobermory's Main Street, running education and engagement sessions to teach the public about the wealth of marine life found is Scottish seas.

=== Hebridean Whale Trail ===
Established in 2019, the Hebridean Whale Trail is a series of whale-watching and whale heritage sites across Hebridean Islands and the West Coast of Scotland designed to encourage accessible and sustainable whale watching from land. The trail also aims to boost local economies and educate visitors about the history and heritage of the Hebrides, particularly Scotland's role in industrial whaling. It includes over 30 sites including: St Kilda; Tiumpan Head (Isle of Lewis); Kilt Rock (Isle of Skye); Kinloch (Isle of Rùm); Ardnamurchan Lighthouse; Glengorm Castle (Isle of Mull); and The Oa (Islay). The site of Huisinish, on the Isle of Harris, is close to the Bunavoneader Whaling Station which closed in 1953.
