= Regent Bridge =

Arch bridge in Edinburgh, Scotland

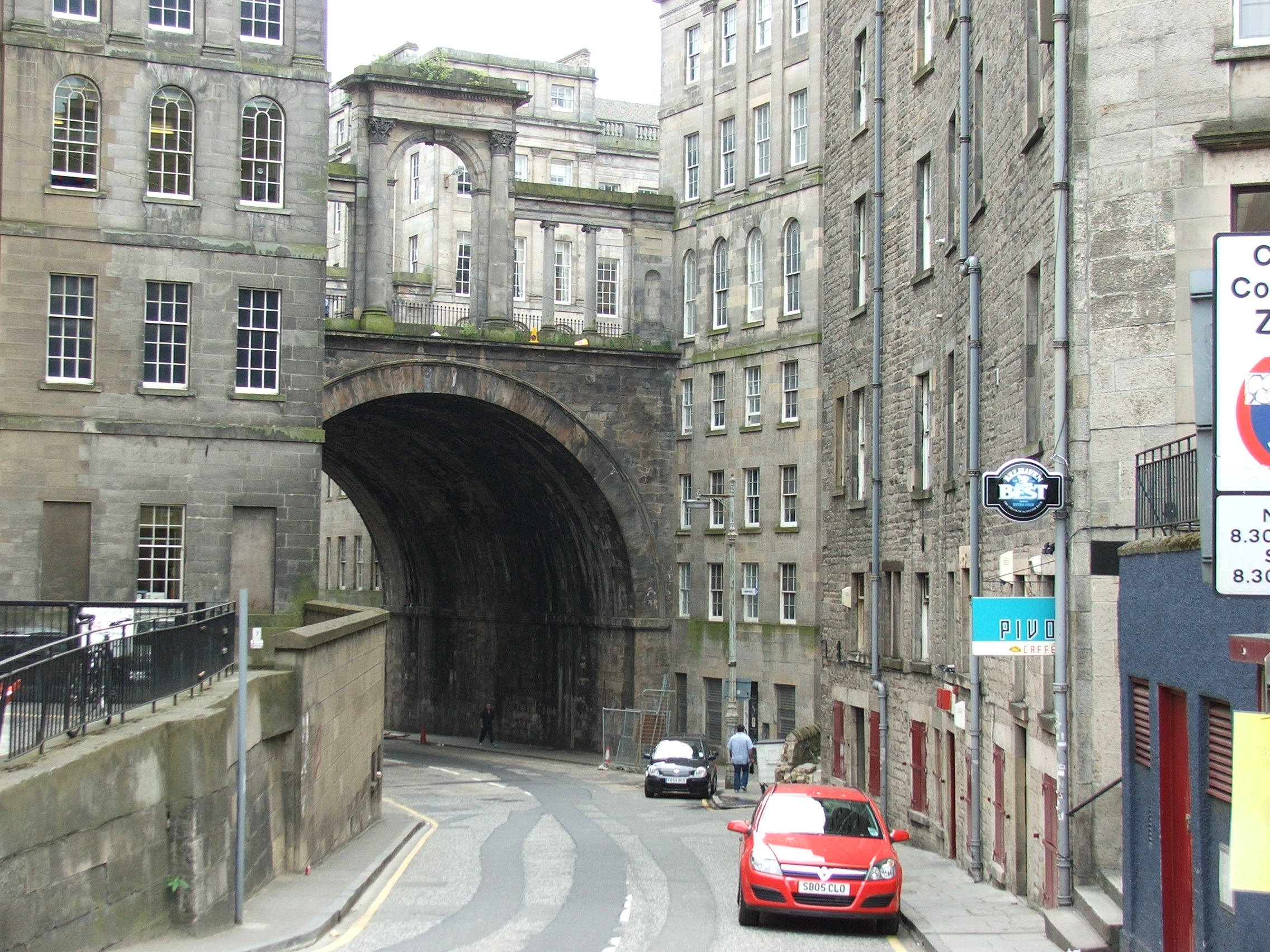
- Calton Road underneath the bridge, with the arches overhead
- Coordinates: 55.95367°N 3.18723°W
- OS grid reference: NT 25965 74041
- Locale: Edinburgh

Characteristics
- Design: Arch
- Material: Stone

History
- Construction start: 1816
- Construction end: 1819

Listed Building – Category A
- Official name: Regent Bridge Carrying Waterloo Place Over Calton Road Including Railings
- Designated: 18 April 1966
- Reference no.: LB27945

Location
- Interactive map of Regent Bridge

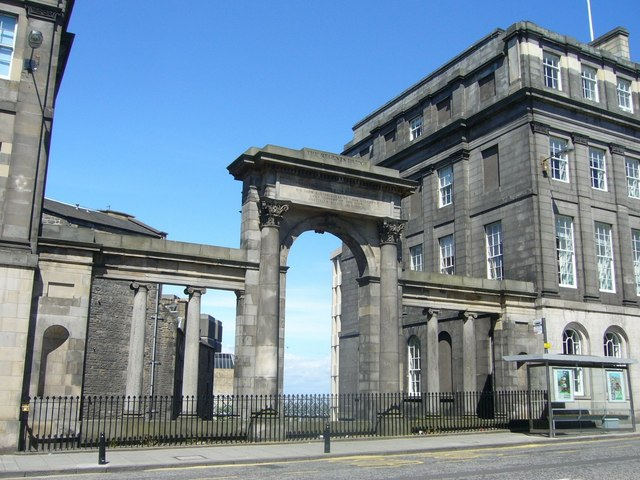
Crossing the bridge itself (Waterloo Place)

Regent Bridge is a road bridge in Edinburgh, Scotland, where the A1 road enters the New Town from the east and passes over a hollow near Calton Hill. The bridge was built in the 19th century, in the neoclassical style as the medieval city was modernised and expanded to the north and east.

== History ==
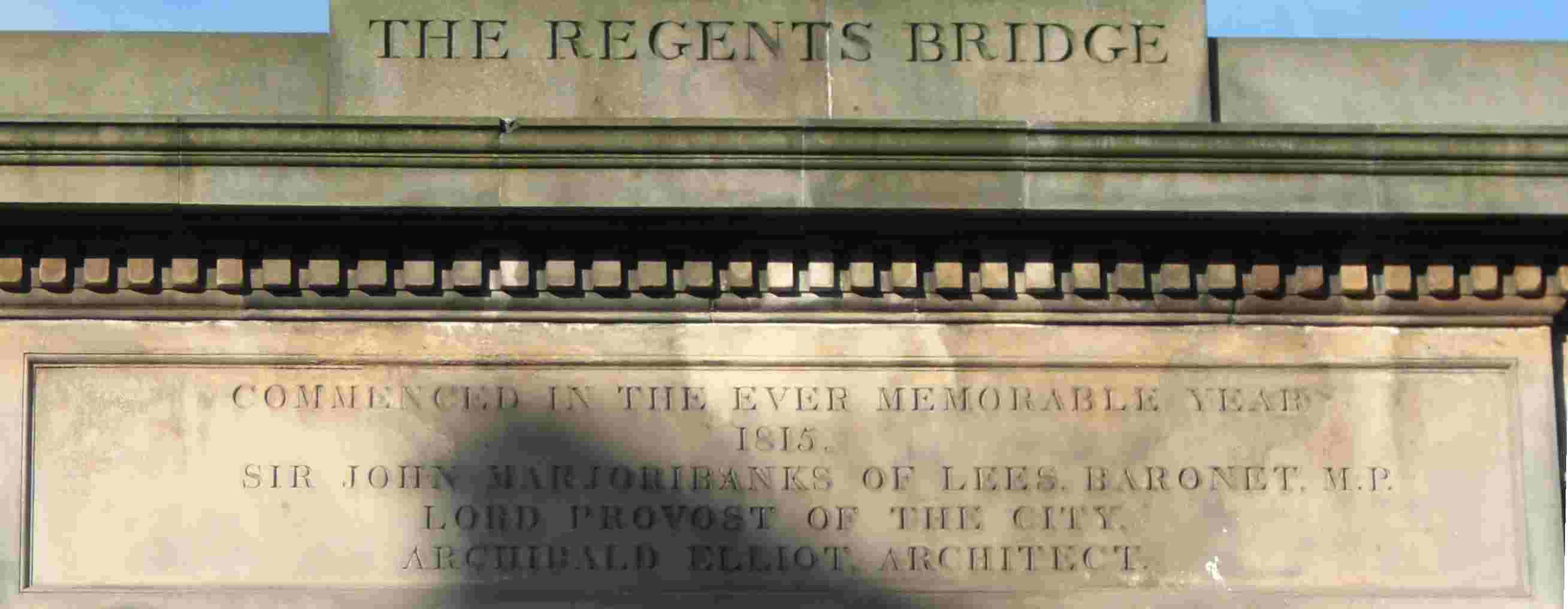
Inscription on the north side of Regent Bridge

In the early nineteenth century, the inconvenient access to Edinburgh by the great London road had long been a subject of general regret. To enter the city from the south, the route ran through narrow and inconvenient streets, an approach that was considered unsuited to the general elegance of the place. In 1814, however, a magnificent entrance was commenced from Calton Hill to Princes Street over a deep ravine called Low Calton that was then occupied by old and ill-built streets. To connect Calton Hill with Princes Street, all these streets were swept away, and an elegant arch, called Regent Bridge, was thrown over the hollow, making the descent from Calton Hill into Princes Street easy and agreeable. A new jail to be built on Calton Hill had also been promoted at this time and a new bridge would make access more suitable.

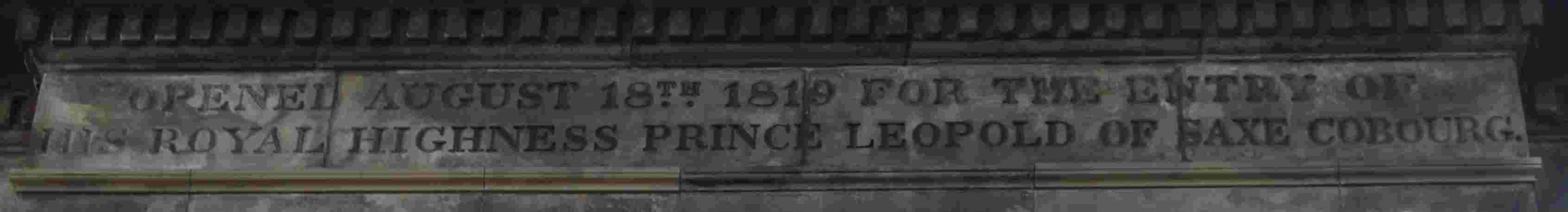
Inscription on the south side of Regent Bridge

In 1813, Sir John Marjoribanks, the then Lord Provost of Edinburgh, revived a plan to build a jail on the slopes of Calton Hill. In order to access this, open up the slopes of Calton Hill to development and shorten the road to East Lothian and England, he presented the plan to build Regent Bridge to the City magistrates on 1 March 1814 with a projected cost of about £20,000 and backed up by a feasibility study by the engineer Robert Stevenson. Although complicated (part of the old Calton burial ground had to be moved, a fifty-foot valley had to be bridged, solid rock had to be blasted and buildings at the east end of Princes Street had to be demolished) the project was accepted and Waterloo Place on top of the bridge was designed by Archibald Elliot. Construction under the direction of Robert Stevenson began in 1816 and the bridge was finished in 1819. It is a major example of Greek Revival architectural work of the time. The arch is semicircular, and fifty feet (15 m) wide. At the north front it is forty-five feet (13.716 m) in height, but at the south front it is sixty-four feet two inches (19.56 m), because the ground declines to the south. The roadway is formed by a number of reverse arches on each side. The great arch is ornamented on the south and north by two ornamental triumphal open arches, supported by elegant Corinthian columns. The whole property purchased to open the communication to the city by this bridge cost £52,000, and the building areas sold for the then immense sum of £35,000. The street along the bridge was called Waterloo Place, as it was laid in the year of the Battle of Waterloo. Regent Bridge was officially opened on 18 August 1819 during the visit of Prince Leopold of Saxe Coburg to Edinburgh.

== Notes ==
- This article contains text from "Regent Bridge, Edinburgh", an article in The Mirror of Literature, Amusement, and Instruction, Vol. 12, Issue 326, 9 August 1828, now in the public domain.

== See also ==
- List of bridges in Scotland
