= Eilean Glas, Scalpay =

Peninsula of Scalpay in the Outer Hebrides, Scotland

Coordinates: 57°51′27″N 06°38′34″W

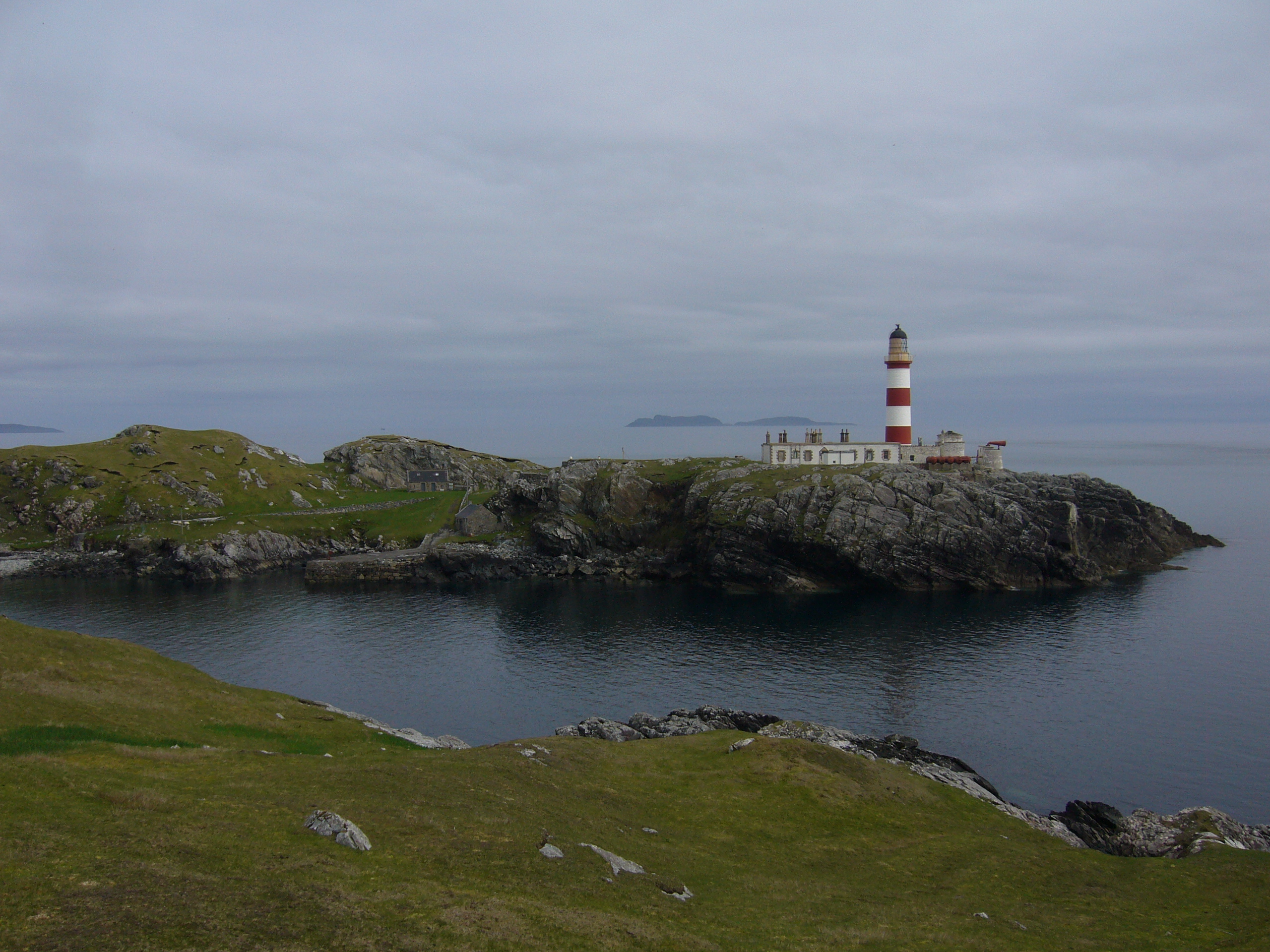
Lighthouse on Eilean Glas

Eilean Glas is a peninsula of Scalpay in the Outer Hebrides, Scotland. Eilean Glas is home to a historic lighthouse, the Eilean Glas Lighthouse. Eilean Glas means Grey/Green Island in Gaelic. The site is also known as Glass Island. The headland on which the lighthouse stands is named Rubh' an Eorna (or Rubha an Eòrna/Rudha an Eòrna), which is equivalent to 'Point of the Barley'.

== Geography ==
Eilean Glas lies on the west coast of Scalpay at NG247948. The island is 300 metres (1,000 feet) long and rises no more than 30 metres (100 feet) above sea level.

The island projects out considerably into The Minch shipping lane, which is likely why it was decided to place the Eilean Glas Lighthouse here. A track across the narrow isthmus connects Eilean Glas to Scalpay. More recently, a radio mast was erected on Eilean Glas.

As well as the Eilean Glas Lighthouse, there is a bothy on the Eilean Glas peninsula, known as the Scalpay Bothy and managed by the North Harris Trust. It includes a small exhibition area, and holds historical information on the area.

Eilean Glas is on the Hebridean Whale and Dolphin Trust Whale Trail, which notes that the species that may be seen from the site include Risso’s dolphins, Harbour porpoise, Minke whales, Basking sharks, Seals, Gannets, Terns and Razorbills.

== History ==
Charles Edward Stewart (‘Bonnie Prince Charlie’) is believed to have escaped to Eilean Glas after the failure of the Jacobite Rising of 1745 at the Battle of Culloden on the 16 April 1746. Charles and his party fled to the Hebrides. At one stage of the escape, they sailed from Borrodale to Benbecula in the Outer Hebrides, and on the 29th April, they sailed from Benbecula to Island Glass at Scalpay. There Charles and a Captain O’Sullivan went under the name Sinclair, calling themselves father and son. Charles remained four nights on the island.

Eilean Glas is associated with rare examples of historical tartan said to have been worn by Charles. The ‘Stonyhurst Specimen’ or ‘Lady Borrodale’s gift’ of tartan is held by Stonyhurst College. After the Battle of Culloden, Charles Edward Stuart stayed with the MacDonalds of Borrodale, and was given a suit of Highland clothing to blend in with the Scottish people. He was taken to Eilean Glas (or Island Glass) by open boat, but the party was caught in a gale in The Minch and all were soaked. Charles exchanged his clothing for dry clothes and left the wet suit with a Robert or Donald Campbell, senior tenant of Scalpay, on the 30 April 1746. A remnant of this suit, left at Eilean Glas and held in the Stonyhurst school museum, is said to be the only authentic reference to tartan known to be worn by Charles or by the Stewarts. Another sample of the tartan, left at Eilean Glas is held at the National Museum of Scotland, with an envelope addressed only to ‘Isabel’.
