= Butt of Lewis =

Most northerly point of Lewis in the Outer Hebrides, Scotland

Butt of Lewis Rubha Robhanais (Scottish Gaelic)
- Headland
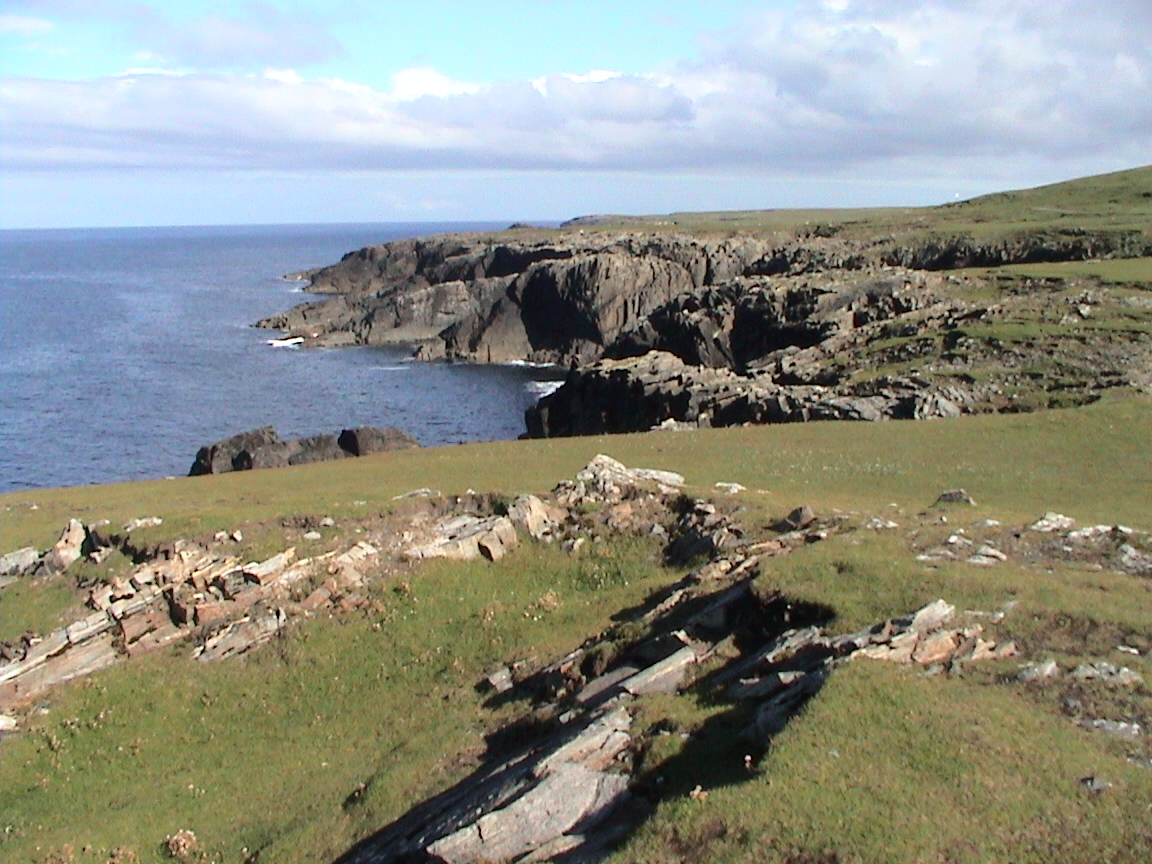
- Butt of Lewis

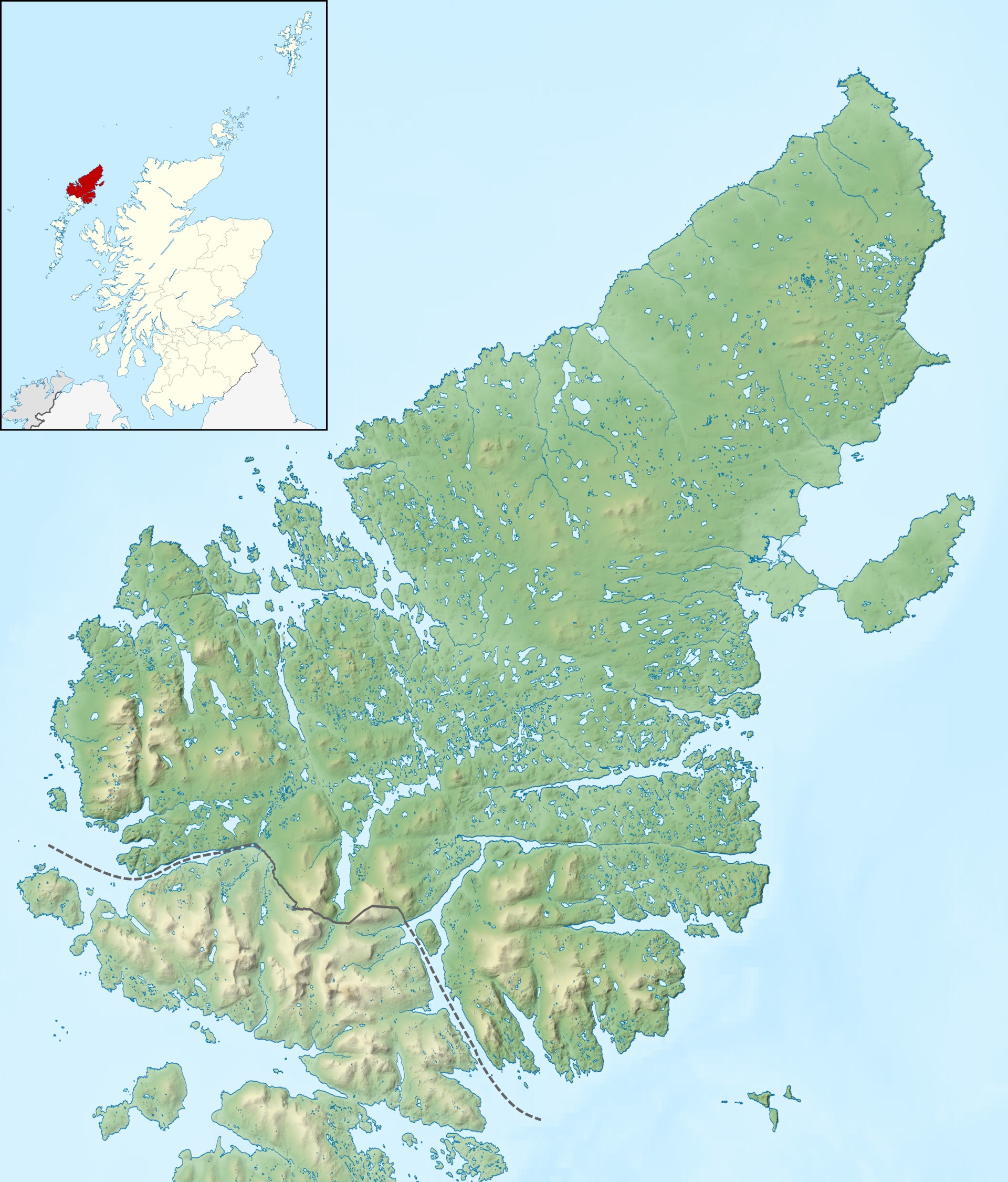
- Location within Lewis Location within Scotland
- Coordinates: 58.5156°N 6.26119°W
- Grid position: NB 51951 66481

The Butt of Lewis (Scottish Gaelic: Rubha Robhanais (Note: Pronounced [ˌrˠu ˈɾo.ə.ˌniʃ].)) is the most northerly point on the Island of Lewis, in the Outer Hebrides, Scotland. The headland, which lies in the North Atlantic, is frequently battered by heavy swells and storms and is marked by the Butt of Lewis Lighthouse. The nearest populated area is the village of Eoropie, about 1 mile (1.5 kilometres) to the south.

The road to the lighthouse passes a sheltered cove called Port Stoth. Southwest from the lighthouse is a natural arch called the "Eye of the Butt" (Scottish Gaelic: Sùil an Rubha).

It is claimed that the Butt of Lewis is one of the windiest locations in the United Kingdom.

== Name ==
The Gaelic name for the Butt of Lewis, Rubha Robhanais, means "Robhanais Point". The name Robhanais, formerly anglicised as Rowaness, comes from the Norse Rófunes, meaning "promontory of the tail".

== Lighthouse ==
The Butt of Lewis Lighthouse was built by the famous lighthouse builder David Stevenson in 1862. Other sources include Thomas Stevenson as one of the builders too. Little is known of the station's early history. A plaque in the lightroom indicates that the present equipment was installed in 1905. The station became the radio link for the keepers on the isolated Flannan Islands in the early 1930s; this continued until 1971, when the lighthouse was automated.

The light was most likely fuelled by fish oil in the beginning. This was then replaced by a paraffin burner in 1869 and finally by electricity in 1976.

It was operated by three keepers who lived at the station with their families, but the fog signal was discontinued on 31 March 1995 and the light was automated on 30 March 1998. It is now remotely monitored from Edinburgh.

Until the early 1960s, all supplies were delivered by sea because of the poor road system on the island. They would be landed at the nearby Port Stoth, where small cargo vessels would regularly berth if the weather allowed, to offload provisions for the lighthouse station.

The Butt of Lewis was also one of the Northern Lighthouse Board transmitting stations for Differential GPS until March 2022.

== Eilean nan Luchruban ==
One kilometre south-west of the Butt is the stack, or small island, of Eilean nan Luchruban, also known as the Pygmies' Isle. The isle was first mentioned by Dean Munro in about 1549 and described as being a "kirk" where pygmies were buried. There are several structures on the island and earlier historical records mention bones in the structures. It was excavated by antiquarians sometime before 1905, when bones and pottery were found. The bones were found to be from animals and the pottery was later found to be from the Neolithic period.

RCAHMS surveyed the isle in 1928 and found part of the structures had collapsed since the excavations. A survey in 2005 found some additional structures not mentioned by the earlier sources.

== Gallery ==
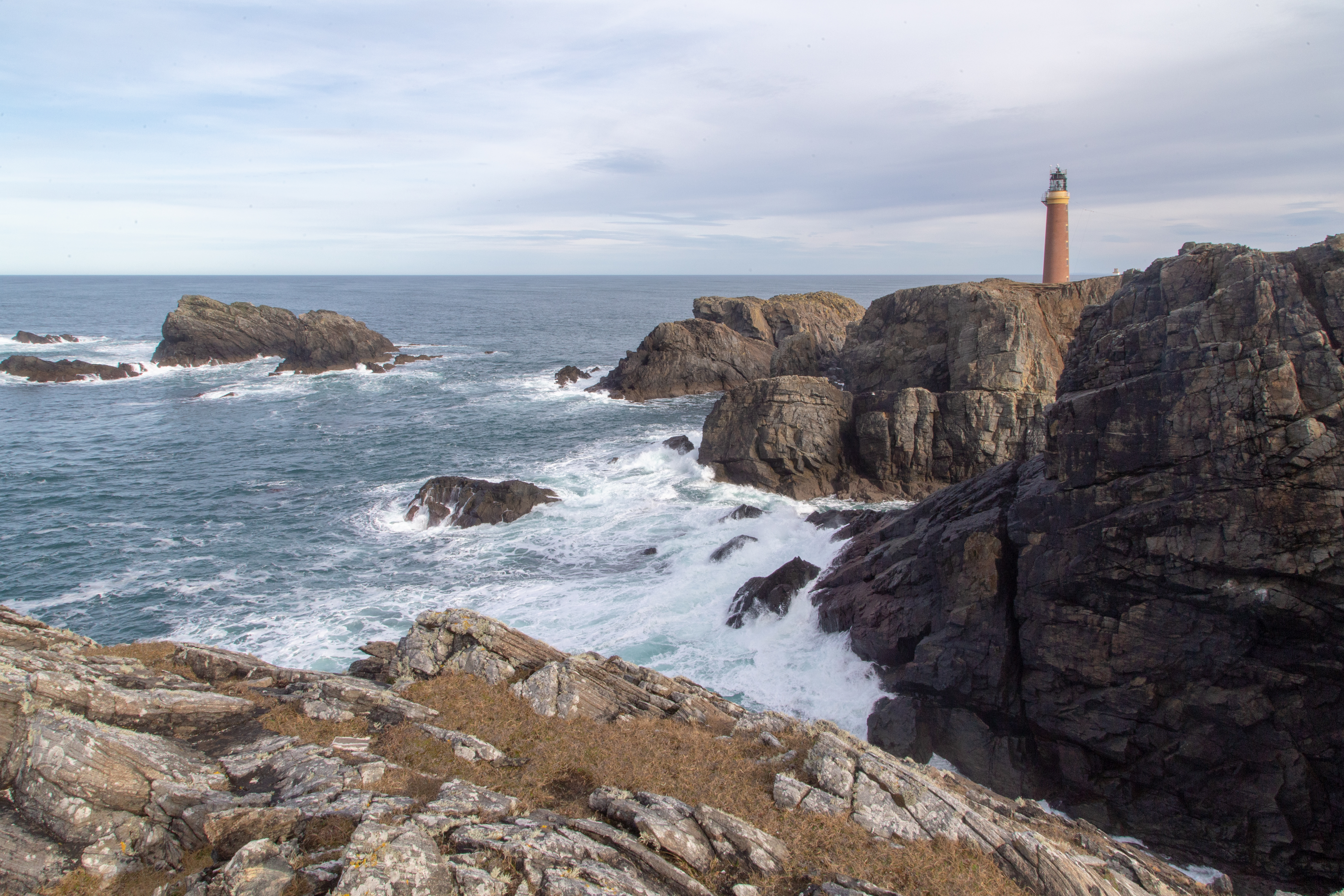

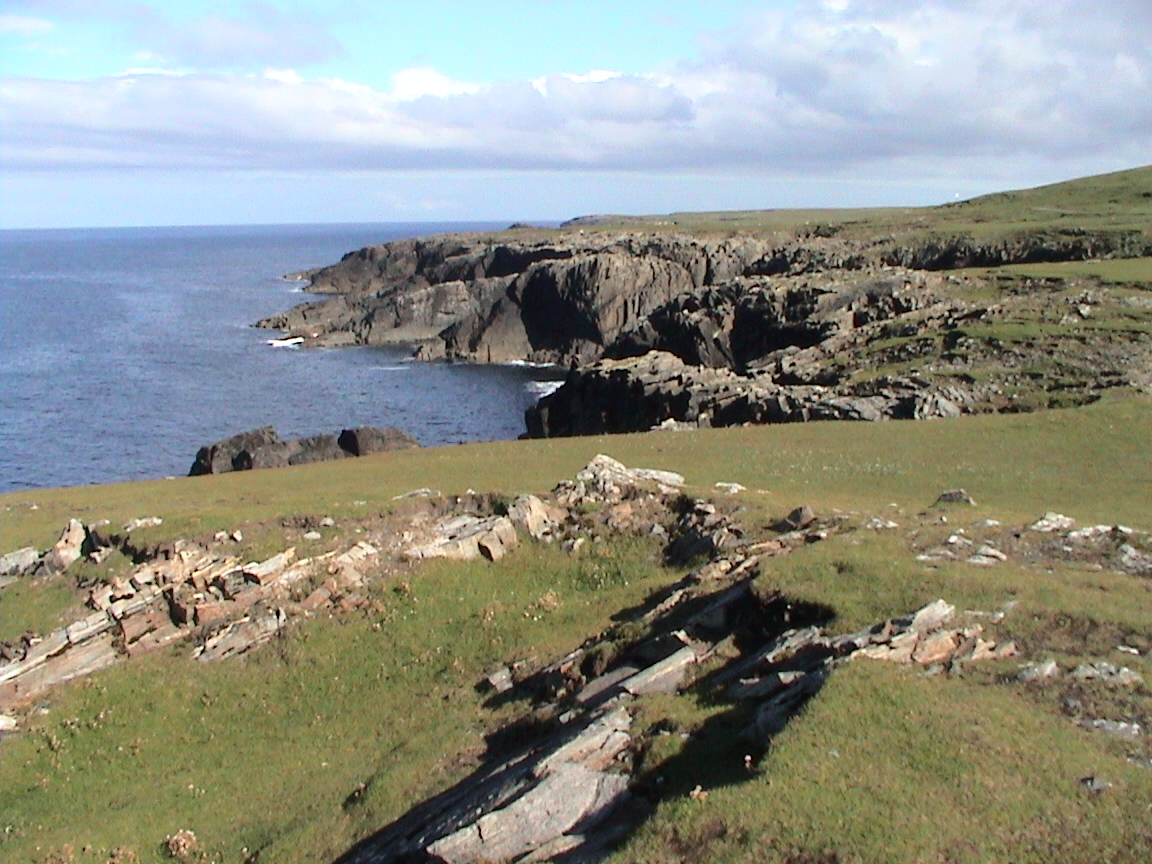

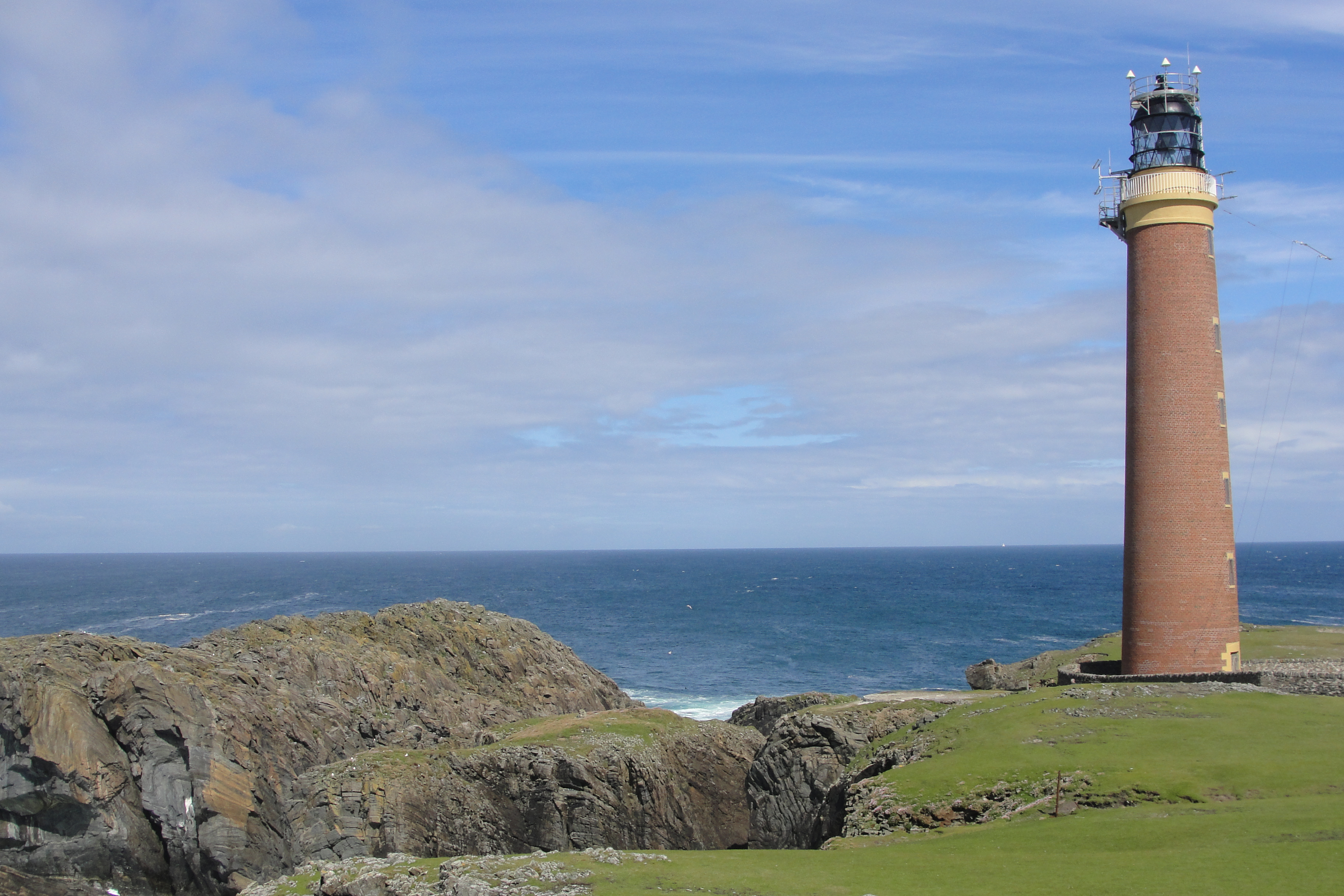

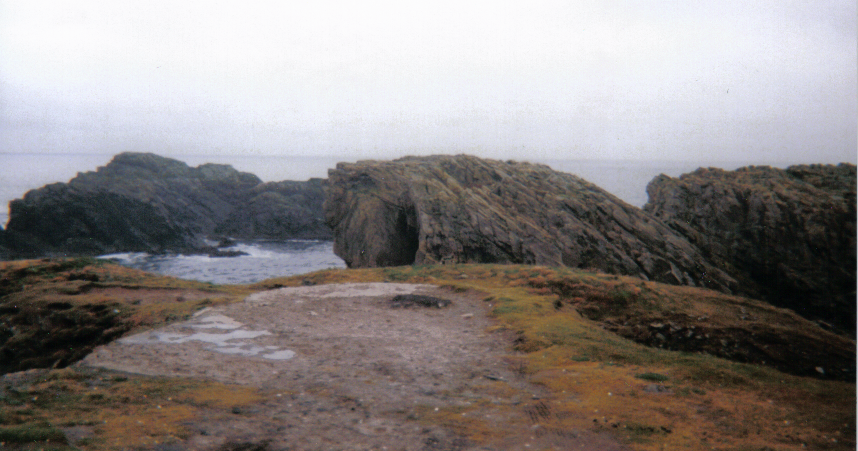

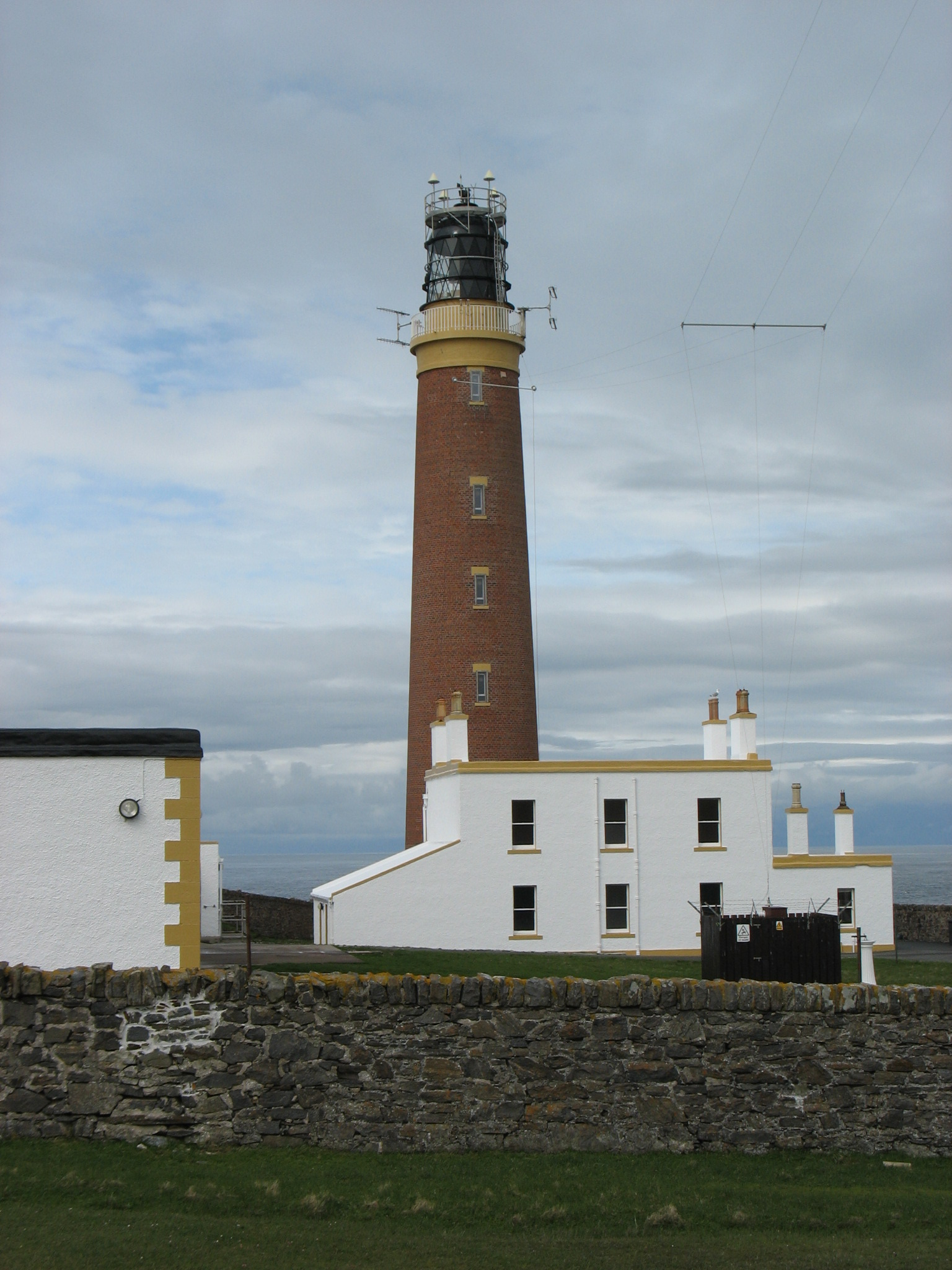
