= Hushinish =

Coordinates: 57.99492°N 7.093499°W

Hushinish: Scottish Gaelic: Hùisinis
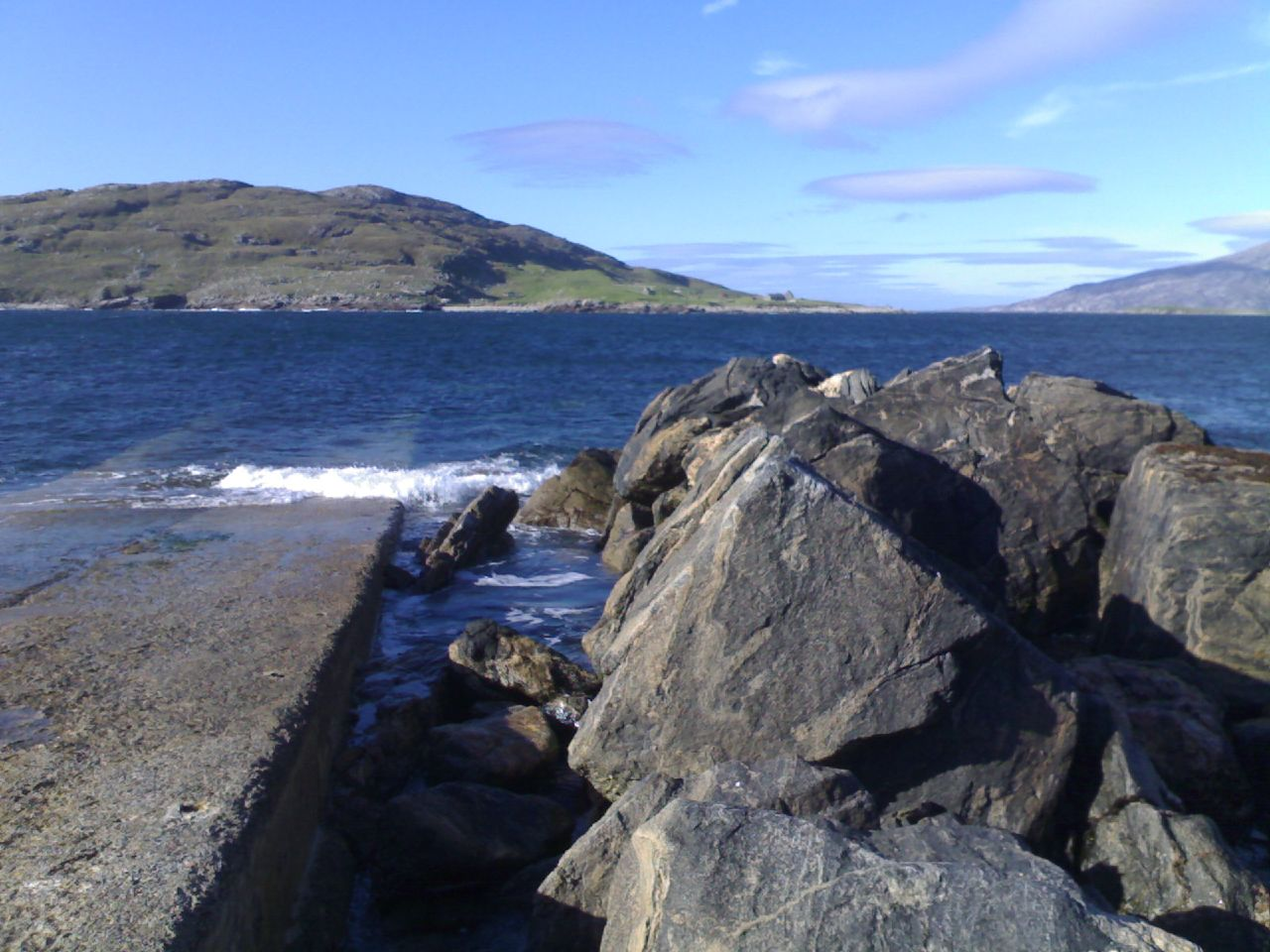
- Hushinish slipway with view of Scarp across the water

- Location within the Outer Hebrides
- OS grid reference: NA990119
- Council area: Na h-Eileanan Siar
- Lieutenancy area: Western Isles
- Country: Scotland
- Sovereign state: United Kingdom
- Post town: ISLE OF HARRIS
- Postcode district: HS3
- Dialling code: 01851
- Police: Scotland
- Fire: Scottish
- Ambulance: Scottish
- UK Parliament: Na h-Eileanan an Iar
- Scottish Parliament: Na h-Eileanan an Iar

Huisinish or Hushinish (Scottish Gaelic Hùisinis) is a remote place on the west coast of Harris in the Outer Hebrides of Scotland. It lies at the end of a 12-mile-long (19 km) single-track B road. The settlement of only four houses overlooking a white sand beach with views to the Atlantic. Nearby, and to the north, lies the uninhabited island of Scarp, the location of an experimental rocket postal service in the 1930s.

Hushinish is the terminus of an infrequent bus service from Tarbert, Harris.

The name Hushinish is derived from Old Norse and means "house headland".
