= Eilean Glas Lighthouse =

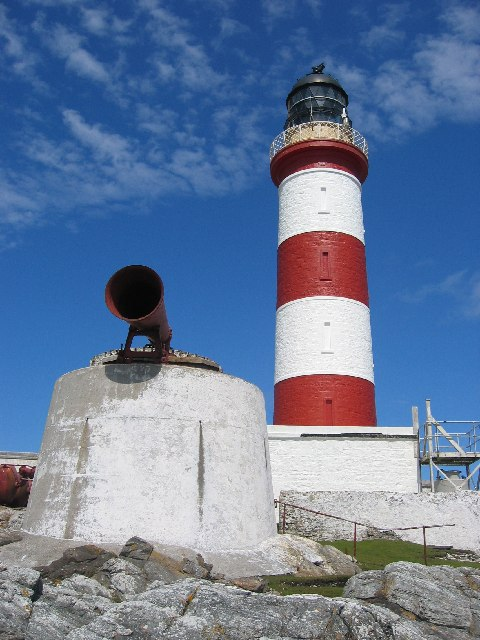
- Eilean Glas lighthouse
- Location: Scalpay; Lewis and Harris; Outer Hebrides; Scotland
- OS grid: NG2474894722
- Coordinates: 57.856916°N 6.642069°W

Tower
- Constructed: 1789 (first)
- Designed by: Thomas Smith
- Construction: masonry tower (current) stone tower (first)
- Automated: 1978
- Height: 30 metres (98 ft)
- Shape: cylindrical tower with balcony and lantern
- Markings: tower with red and white bands, black lantern
- Operator: Northern Lighthouse Board
- Heritage: category A listed building

Light
- First lit: 1824 (current by Robert Stevenson)
- Deactivated: 1824 (first)
- Focal height: 43 metres (141 ft)
- Lens: catoptric sealed beam lamps
- Intensity: 400,000 candela
- Range: 23 nautical miles (43 km; 26 mi)
- Characteristic: Fl (3) W 20s.

Eilean Glas Lighthouse is on the east coast of the island of Scalpay in the Outer Hebrides of Scotland. It was one of the original four lights commissioned by the Commissioners of the Northern Lights, and the first in the Hebrides (the others were Kinnaird Head, Mull of Kintyre and North Ronaldsay). These lighthouses were built by Thomas Smith.

Eilean Glas light was first displayed in 1789. The original tower was replaced in 1824 by Smith's stepson Robert Stevenson. In 1852 the light was changed to a revolving system lens. The lighthouse was an early candidate for automation and this was carried out in 1978. Several of the original buildings have been sold off. The fog signal was discontinued in the 1980s although the horn remains in place as a decoration.

The 30-metre (98 ft) tower is painted with two distinctive broad red bands. Light is now from catoptric sealed beam lamps, (similar to car head lights) mounted on a gearless pedestal.

In 2004, the owners of the lighthouse building were convicted of theft and of running a fraudulent charity to pay for the mortgage on the property. Their 3-year sentence was later reduced to 2 years at the Court of Appeal.

The lighthouse is owned and operated by the Northern Lighthouse Board, and the site's other buildings are owned by North Harris Trust and Eilean Glas Trust. The site is a Category A listed building.

== See also ==
- List of lighthouses in Scotland
- List of Northern Lighthouse Board lighthouses
- List of Category A listed buildings in the Western Isles
