= Loch na Berie =

Loch Na Berie
- Traigh Na Berie
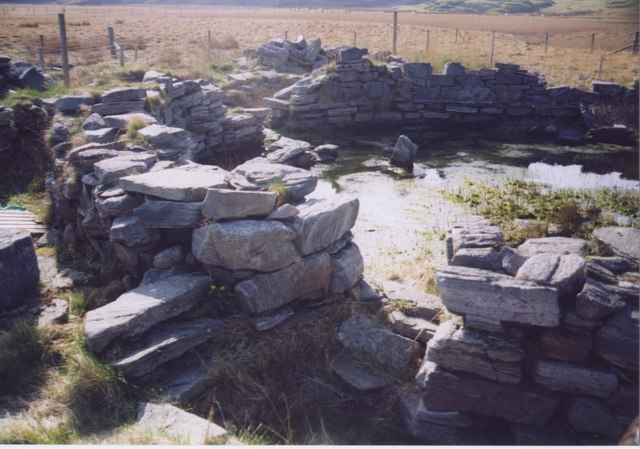
- The broch in 2003

- Location within Lewis
- 58°12′35″N 6°56′00″W
- Type: Broch
- Periods: Iron Age / Early medieval
- Location: Isle of Lewis

Loch Na Berie is a broch in the Outer Hebrides of Scotland, located approximately 400 yards from the shore, and is thought to have been located on an island as the land to the east is a marsh. The site is designated a Scheduled Monument.

== History ==
Loch na Berie is the site of an Iron Age Broch and associated causeway. The site was excavated in the 1980s, which identified that the Broch had survived to first floor level.

== Location ==
The site is located on the Isle of Lewis, at Loch na Berie. The Loch has mainly reverted to marshland.

== Construction ==
Loch na Berie is roughly 16.5 meters in diameter and the walls are roughly 3 meters thick. A modern causeway made of stones robbed from the broch was built to the west of the broch, though it is thought that an ancient causeway underlies the modern one.
