= Robert Stevenson (civil engineer) =

Civil engineer and lighthouse designer (1772–1850)

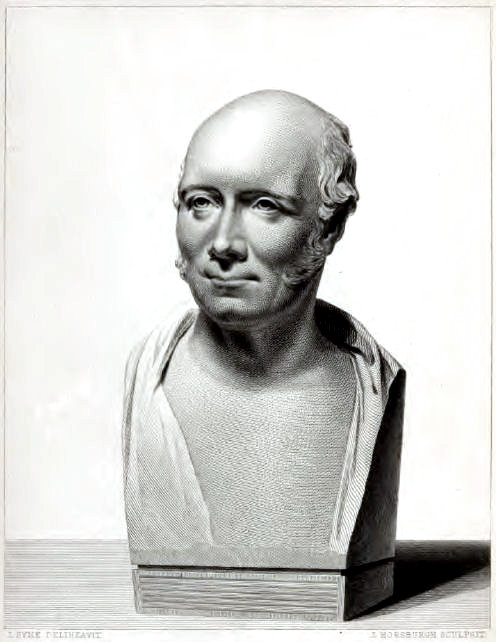
- Bust of Stevenson by Samuel Joseph, commissioned 19 July 1824 by the Northern Lighthouse Board. Illustration from the Biographical Sketch of the Late Robert Stevenson: Civil Engineer by his son Alan Stevenson, 1851
- Born: 8 June 1772; Glasgow, Scotland
- Died: 12 July 1850 (aged 78); Edinburgh, Scotland
- Resting place: New Calton Cemetery, Edinburgh
- Education: Andersonian Institute; University of Edinburgh
- Occupation: Civil engineer
- Spouse: Jean Smith
- Children: Alan, David and Thomas
- Engineering career
- Discipline: Civil engineer
- Institutions: Royal Society of Edinburgh; Geological Society; Royal Astronomical Society; Society of Antiquaries of Scotland; Wernerian Society; Institution of Civil Engineers
- Employer: Northern Lighthouse Board
- Projects: Bell Rock Lighthouse
- Significant design: Lighthouses

Robert Stevenson FRSE FGS FRAS (8 June 1772 – 12 July 1850) was a Scottish civil engineer, and designer and builder of lighthouses. His works include the Bell Rock Lighthouse.

== Early life ==
Robert Stevenson was born in Glasgow. His father was Alan Stevenson, a partner in a West Indies sugar trading house in the city. Alan died of an epidemic fever on the island of St. Christopher in the West Indies on 26 May 1774, a few days before Robert's second birthday. Robert's uncle died of the same disease around the same time. Since this left Alan's widow, Jean Lillie Stevenson, in much-reduced financial circumstances, Robert was educated, as a young child, at a charity school.

Robert's mother intended him to join the ministry, so when he was a bit older she enrolled him in the school of a locally famous Glasgow linguist, a Mr Macintyre. But when Robert was 15, she remarried and the family moved to 1 Blair Street, off the Royal Mile in Edinburgh. Robert's new stepfather was Thomas Smith, a tinsmith, lamp maker, ingenious mechanic, and civil engineer, who had been appointed to the newly formed Northern Lighthouse Board in 1786.

In 1798 or 1799, when Robert was about 26, the family moved to a newly built home, 2 Baxters Place, at the head of Leith Walk.

In 1815, Robert's stepfather died, and Robert inherited the house, where he continued to live until about 1820.

== Professional career ==
Scottish lighthouses constructed by Robert Stevenson

Stevenson served as an apprentice civil engineer to his stepfather, Thomas Smith. He was so successful at it that, at age 19, he was given responsibility for supervising the erection of a lighthouse on Little Cumbrae island in the River Clyde. His next project was overseeing the building of lighthouses on Orkney. While working on these projects, he continued his civil engineering studies: He diligently practised surveying and architectural drawing, and attended maths and physics lectures at the Andersonian Institute in Glasgow.

In the winter, when it was too chilly for construction work, he attended lectures at the University of Edinburgh in philosophy, mathematics, chemistry, natural history, moral philosophy, logic, and agriculture. He was not granted a degree because he did not have the proficiency in Latin or Greek that was a requirement for a degree in those days.

In 1797, he was appointed engineer to the Lighthouse Board, succeeding to his stepfather's place there. In 1799, he married Smith's eldest daughter Jean, who was also his stepsister, and, in 1800, Smith made him his business partner.

The most important work of Stevenson's life was the Bell Rock Lighthouse, built between 1807 and 1810 when he was in his mid-30s. The lighthouse still stands today. Its construction was a scheme long in the gestation, and then long (and extremely hazardous) in the construction. Its structure was based upon the design of the Eddystone Lighthouse, which had been built by John Smeaton — but Stevenson made several improvements to that design. John Rennie was a consulting engineer on the project. After the project was complete, there was some contention as to who should get more credit—Rennie or Stevenson. That contention grew particularly strong as between the two men's sons when they were older - Robert's son Alan Stevenson and John Rennie's son, Sir John Rennie. Samuel Smiles, a popular engineering author of the time, published an account taken from Rennie, which gave prominence to Rennie's claim. However, the Northern Lighthouse Board gave full credit to Stevenson, as have historians since then.

Stevenson's work on the Bell Rock and elsewhere provided a fund of anecdotes about the dangers he tended to place himself in and his lucky narrow escapes. For example, in 1794, he was aboard the sloop Elizabeth of Stromness, returning from the Orkney Islands, when it became becalmed off Kinnaird Head. Unlike others aboard the ship, he had the good fortune to be taken off it and rowed ashore. After he left it, a gale arose and drove the ship back to Orkney, where it foundered: All aboard were drowned. Another time, he was with a crew of men on the Bell Rock, which was only above the surface of the water at the lowest tide, when one of the crew boats drifted away. The remaining boats did not have enough room to carry everyone back to the mainland. Once the tide rose, the rock would have been submerged, and anyone not in a boat would have been stranded in the water. Luckily, before the tide rose, the Bell Rock pilot boat happened to arrive on an errand to deliver some mail to Stevenson, and thus saved the situation.

Stevenson served as the engineer to the Northern Lighthouse Board until 1842 - nearly fifty years. During that time he designed numerous lighthouses and oversaw their construction and the addition of later improvements to them. His many innovations included his choice of light sources and mountings, his reflector design, his use of Fresnel lenses, and his use of rotation and shuttering systems that provided lighthouses with individual signatures (characteristics) — allowing them to be identified by seafarers, for example the light at Rinns of Islay Lighthouse. For this latter innovation, he was awarded a gold medal by King William I of the Netherlands.

Engineering skills were in high demand after the Battle of Waterloo, which marked the end of the continental wars, as the focus turned toward improving the country's infrastructure. So Stevenson was kept busy. In addition to his work for the Northern Lighthouse Board, he served as a consulting engineer on many projects, collaborating with other engineers such as John Rennie, Alexander Nimmo, Thomas Telford, William Walker, Archibald Elliot, and William Cubitt. These projects included the construction of roads, bridges, harbours, canals, railways, and aids to river navigation. He designed and oversaw the construction in Glasgow of the Hutcheson Bridge, and in Edinburgh of the Regent Bridge and approaches to it from the east. He also produced a number of designs for canals and railways which were not built, and new and improved designs for bridges, some of which were later implemented by his successors. He invented the movable jib and the balance crane as necessary aids to lighthouse construction, and, as George Stephenson noted, he led the trend toward using malleable rather than cast-iron rails in the construction of railways.

In 1815, he was made a Fellow of the Royal Society of Edinburgh. His proposers were John Barclay, John Playfair and David Brewster.

In 1821, while on a Northern Lighthouse Board inspection cruise of lighthouses he visited Scalpay, Outer Hebrides, where Murdo MacLellan of Scalpay who was tacksman of St Kilda, Scotland gave him and John Fleming (naturalist) a live Great auk captured on St Kilda. They planned to take it alive to Edinburgh. They allowed it to swim in the sea with a line attached to a leg it escaped near Isle of Arran, this was the last Great Auk seen in Britain, the species became extinct in 1840s.

In 1824, he published a paper about the condition of the eastern coastline of the United Kingdom, entitled Account of the Bell Rock Lighthouse. In it, he presented convincing evidence that the North Sea was eroding that coastline, and in particular that the great sandbanks were disappearing — the spoils taken by the sea. He hypothesized that freshwater and saltwater areas at river mouths exist as separate and distinct streams, and carried out tests of this hypothesis. He contributed articles to the Encyclopædia Britannica and the Edinburgh Encyclopædia, and published papers in a number of scientific journals.

He was inducted into the Scottish Engineering Hall of Fame in 2016.

== Family life ==
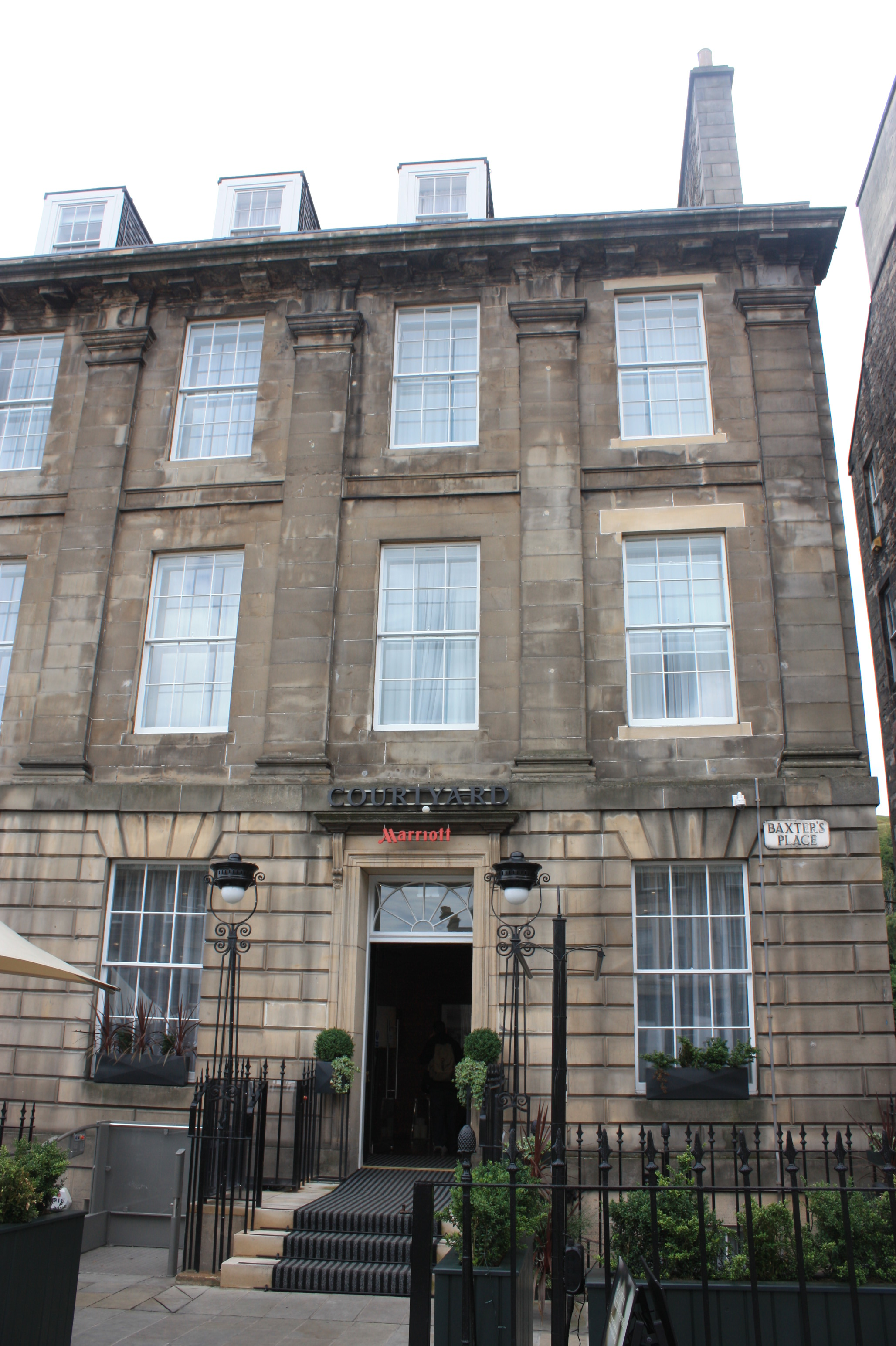
1 Baxters Place, Edinburgh

In 1799, Robert married his stepsister, Jean Smith, who was his stepfather Thomas Smith's eldest daughter by his first wife. A number of their children died young, including three who died of childhood diseases early in 1808, during the construction of Bell Rock.

Three of Stevenson's sons became engineers: Alan, David and Thomas. Robert's other surviving child was Jane (1801–1864). Jane became her father's secretary and helped him write and illustrate his account of the Bell Rock Lighthouse construction. He had two grandchildren who became well-known: His son Alan was the father of the author and journalist Katharine de Mattos, and his son Thomas was the father of the author Robert Louis Stevenson.

Stevenson lived in Baxter's Place at the head of Leith Walk for most of his later years, moving from No. 2 to the far larger No. 1 around 1820. In 1985, the building was named "Robert Stevenson House" in his honour. It was used as an office from 1985 to 2015. The building was converted into a Marriott Hotel in 2017, at which point the name was removed.

Stevenson died on 12 July 1850, at 1 Baxters Place in Edinburgh. He is buried in the Stevenson family plot in the New Calton Burial Ground.

== Memorials to Stevenson ==
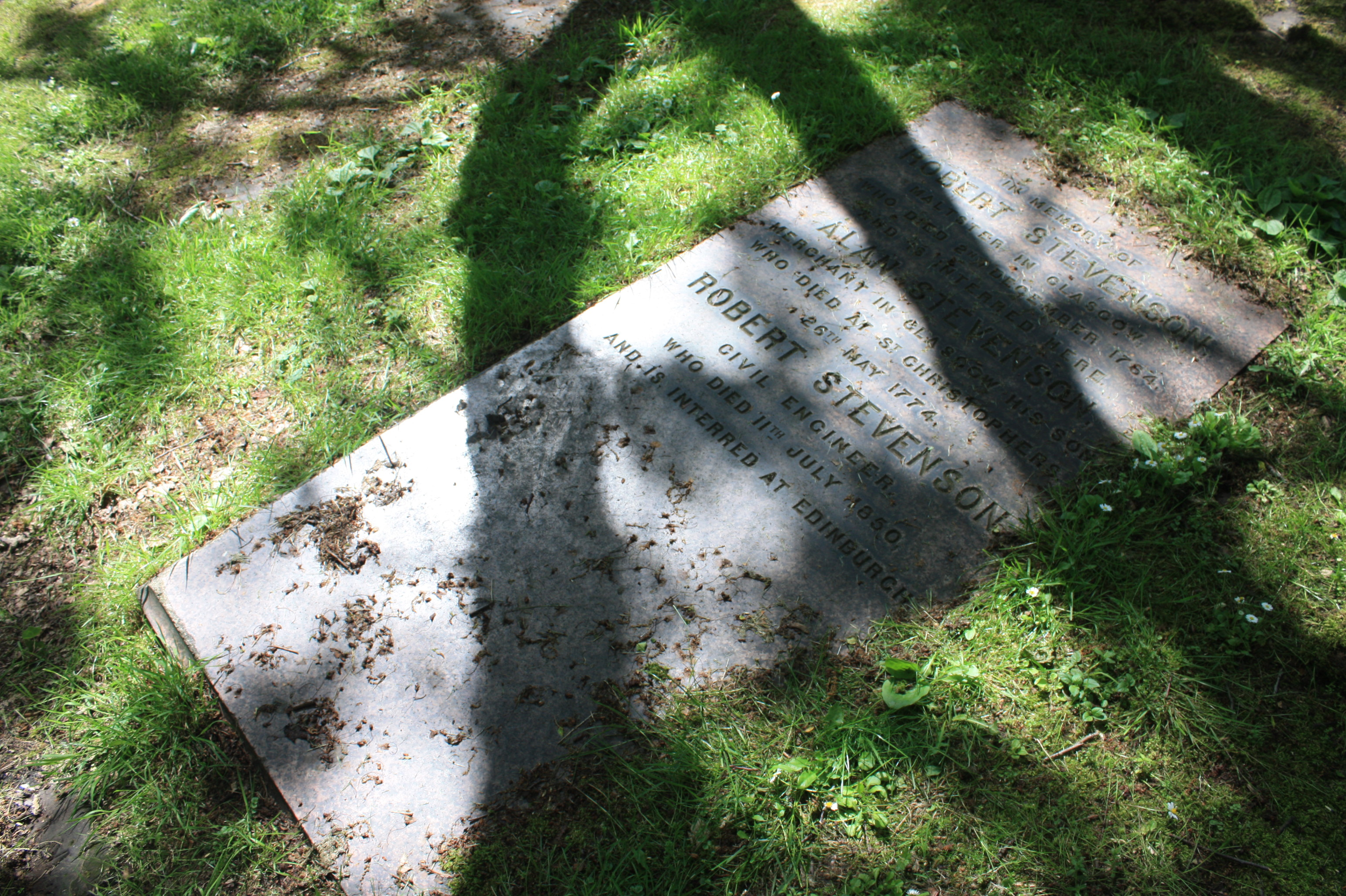
Robert Stevenson is remembered on his grandfather's grave in the churchyard of Glasgow Cathedral, though he was buried in Edinburgh

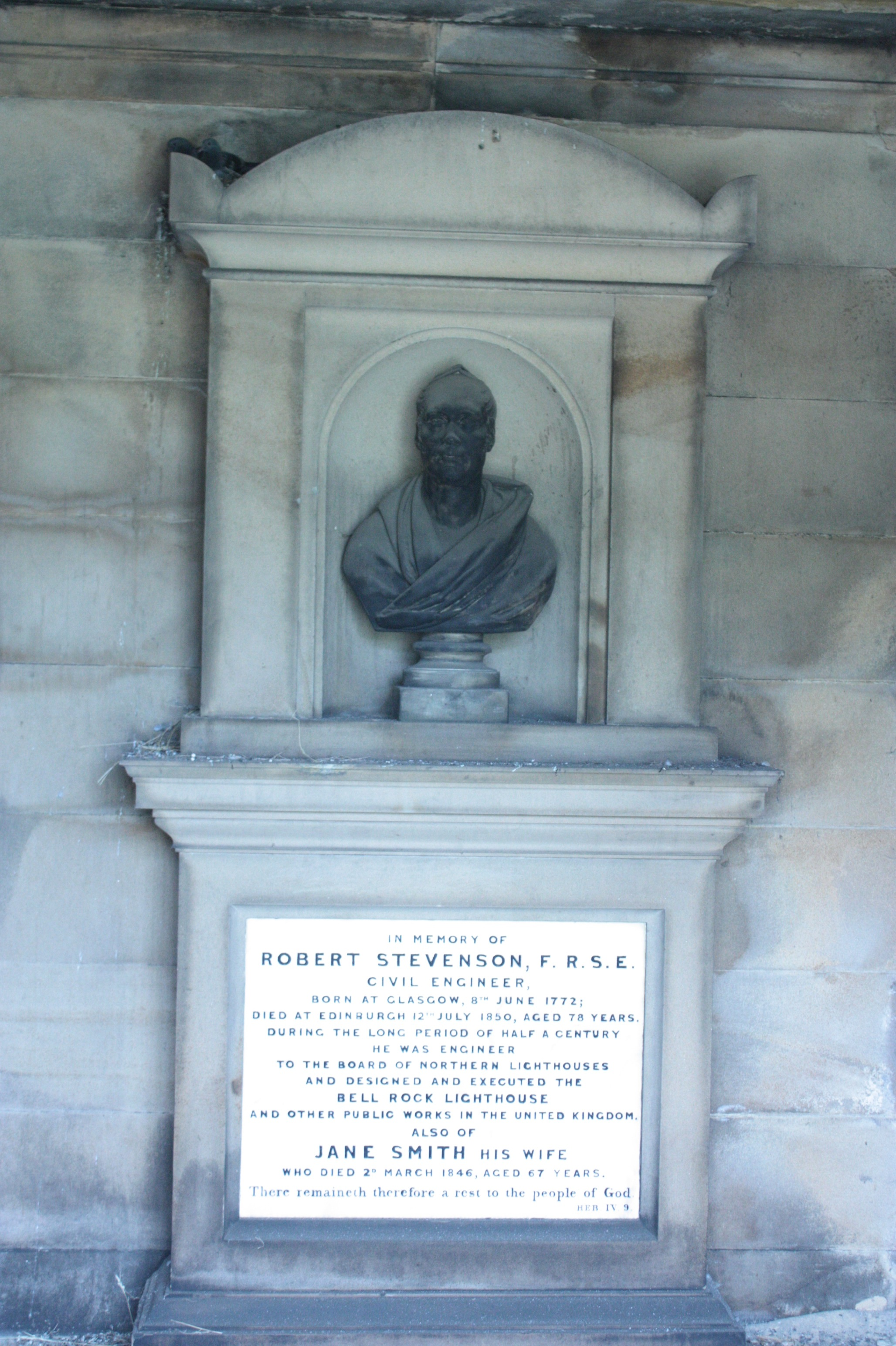
Stevenson's gravestone, New Calton Burial Ground, Edinburgh

Stevenson College, Edinburgh, named after Robert Stevenson, was founded in 1970. For a good portion of his life, Stevenson lived at 1 Baxter's Place, Edinburgh. In 1985, the building was named “Robert Stevenson House” in his memory. (The name was removed in 2015 because Marriott bought the building to convert it to a hotel.)

Robert and his father, Alan, are memorialized on the gravestone of his grandfather, a Glasgow merchant — also named Robert Stevenson - who died in 1764 and was buried in the churchyard of Glasgow Cathedral.

== Biographies ==
The Lighthouse Stevensons, published in 1999, is an account of the professional accomplishments of Stevenson and his sons, written by Bella Bathurst (Harper Collins Publishers, 1999, ISBN 0-06-019427-8).

== Structures designed by Robert Stevenson ==
=== Lighthouses ===
- Bell Rock (1811)
- Toward Point (1812)
- Isle of May (1816)
- Corsewall (1817)
- North Queensferry Harbour Light Tower (1817)
- Point of Ayre (1818)
- Calf of Man (1818)
- Sumburgh Head (1821)
- Kinnaird Head (Rebuild, 1823)
- Eilean Glas Lighthouse, Scalpay (Rebuild, 1824)
- Rinns of Islay, Orsay, Inner Hebrides (1825)
- Buchan Ness (1827)
- Pentland Skerries Lighthouse, Pentland Firth (Rebuild, 1827)
- Cape Wrath (1828)
- Tarbat Ness (1830)
- Mull of Galloway (1830)
- Dunnet Head (1831)
- Girdle Ness (1833)
- Barra Head (1833)
- Lismore (1833)
- Dubh Artach (1872)

=== Other ===
- Annan Bridge
- Hutcheson Bridge, Glasgow
- Marykirk Bridge
- Regent Bridge, designed by Archibald Elliot. (Stevenson carried out feasibility study and was in charge of construction)
- The Melville Column, Edinburgh. (Stevenson did not design this, but advised on foundations)
- Stirling New Bridge
- Allenton bridge

== Family tree ==
Robert Stevenson engineering family tree

Thomas Smith (engineer) | Jean Lille Stevenson
Joan Smith
David Stevenson (engineer) | Alan Stevenson (engineer)
Charles Alexander Stevenson (engineer) | David Alan Stevenson (engineer)
D. Alan Stevenson (engineer)

Alan Stevenson (merchant)
Robert Stevenson (civil engineer)
Thomas Stevenson (engineer)
Robert Louis Stevenson

== See also ==
- Richard Henry Brunton
