= Orient Point =

Orient Point may refer to:

- Orient Point, New South Wales, Australia
- Orient Point, New York, United States
  - Orient Point Light, lighthouse in New York
