= Makapuʻu =

Extreme eastern end of Oʻahu, Hawaii

Coordinates: 21.3097°N 157.6573°W

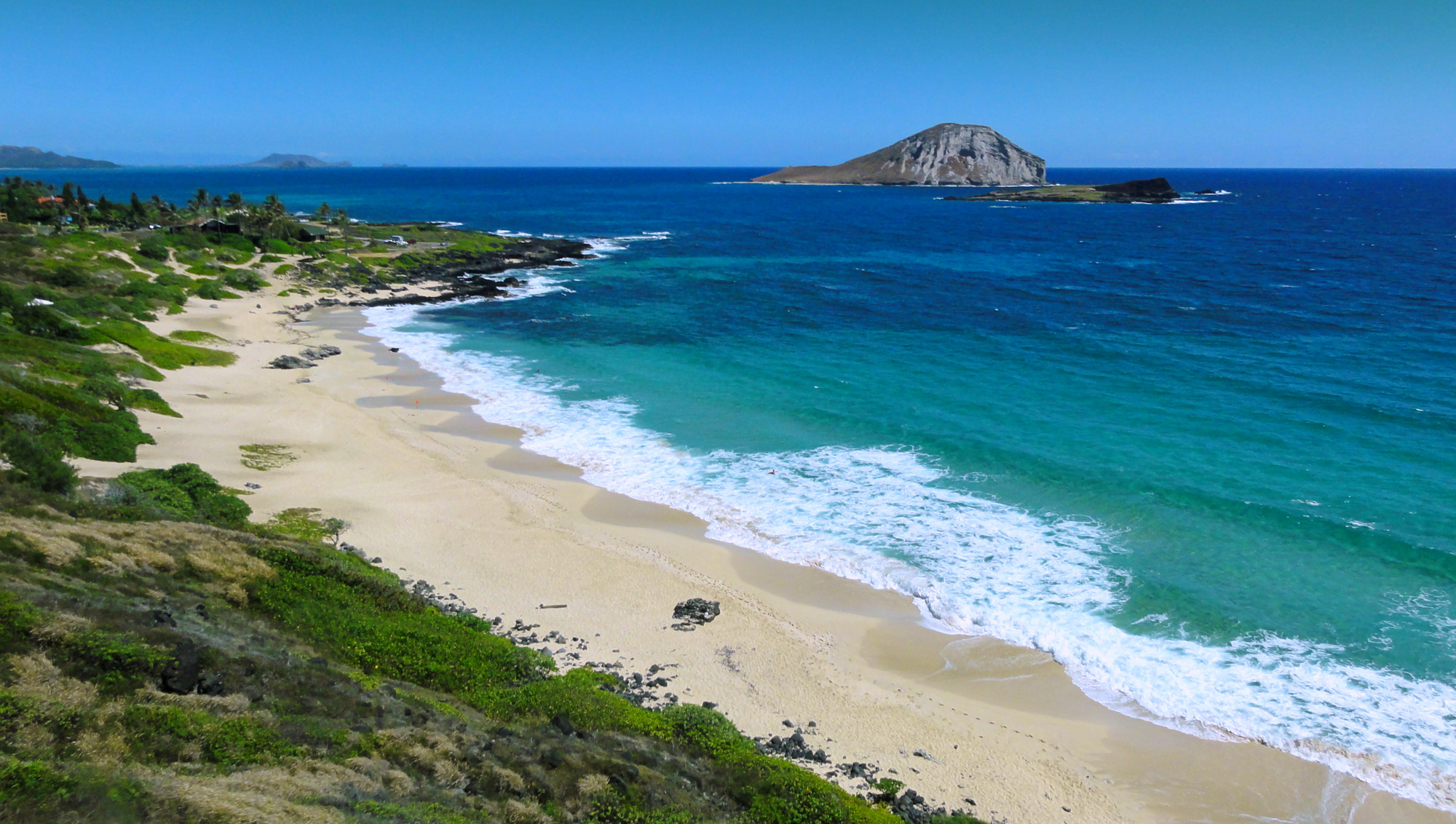
Makapuʻu Beach

Makapuʻu is the extreme eastern end of the Island of Oʻahu in the Hawaiian Islands, comprising the remnant of a ridge that rises 647 feet (197 m) above the sea. The cliff at Makapuʻu Point forms the eastern tip and is the site of a prominent lighthouse. The place name of this area, meaning "bulging eye" in Hawaiian, is thought to derive from the name of an image said to have been located in a cave here called Keanaokeakuapōloli. The entire area is quite scenic and a panoramic view is presented at the lookout on Kalanianaole Highway (State Rte. 72) where the roadway surmounts the cliff just before turning south towards leeward Oʻahu and Honolulu.

The Makapuʻu area is reached approximately 2 kilometers (1.2 mi) east of Waimānalo Beach on Kalanianaole Highway (State Rte. 72) or from the Honolulu side (south shore; Hawaiʻi Kai) travelling east along the same highway beyond Sandy Beach. The Makapuʻu Point State Wayside Park, a 38-acre (15 ha) roadside park, is about midway up the draw on the right-hand side coming from Hawaiʻi Kai.

Features of special interest in this area include:

- Sea Life Park Hawaii – A large commercial park and aquarium featuring displays and shows of Hawaiian marine life.

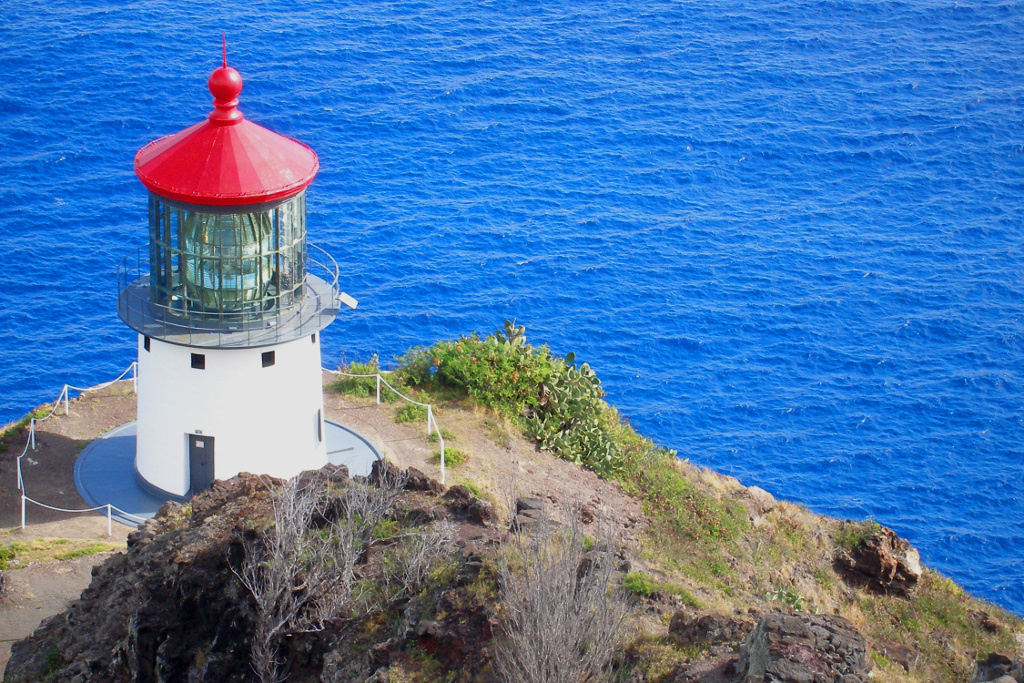
Makapuʻu Point lighthouse

- Makapuʻu Point Lighthouse is a 46-foot-tall (14 m), active United States Coast Guard lighthouse established in 1909. Construction for the lighthouse was prompted by the grounding of the steamer Manchuria in the predawn hours on August 20, 1906 on the reefs off Waimānalo. The lighthouse was automated in 1974 and its keepers quarters demolished in 1987, but the remnants are still visible. The lighthouse contains a roughly 12-foot-tall (3.7 m) French Fresnel hyper-radial lens, the largest lens in use in the United States. The lens is able to magnify and intensify the illumination of a single electrical 1,000-watt, 120-volt light bulb. It was damaged by a vandal firing a bullet at it, but the lens is still in service as it is no longer reproducible. A popular day hike along the access road to the lighthouse begins at a parking lot located south of the Makapuʻu lookout on Kalanianaole Highway. A second trail leads from the remnants of the keepers quarters to the lighthouse, but it is off limits to the public. The lighthouse itself is also off limits to the public and is protected by three locked gates.
- Makapuʻu Point State Wayside is part of the eastern end of Oʻahu encompassing Makapuʻu Head and the lighthouse at Makapuʻu Point. A paved road, open to the public for foot traffic only, leads out to the Makapuʻu Lighthouse. The trail is roughly 1.75 miles (2.82 km) long and rises mostly heading towards the south along the land-side of the ridge and curves around Puʻu o Kīpahulu (southern end of the ridge), then traverses the ridge bearing right towards the lighthouse, which is closed to the public. A trail leads up from the former Coast Guard residential area to a summit from which the islands of Molokaʻi and Lanaʻi may be seen across the Kaiwi Channel. On particularly clear days, the island of Maui can be visible. Of interest to hikers visiting the wayside park is the possibility of seeing Humpback whales in the waters offshore between the months of November and April. A telescope is available to the public at the summit lookout. There are so-called blowholes along the rocky shore below Makapuʻu Head which are sometimes active.
- Mānana Island is a 63-acre (25 ha) offshore tuff cone known as Rabbit Island because of its resemblance to a large rabbit's head rising out of the sea and because it was once inhabited by introduced rabbits after a rancher released them there. The island is now a protected bird sanctuary and thereby illegal to land there unless you have permission from the Hawaii Department of Land Natural Resources.
- Kāohikaipu – A low volcanic islet off Makapuʻu Beach Park; also a State Bird Sanctuary.

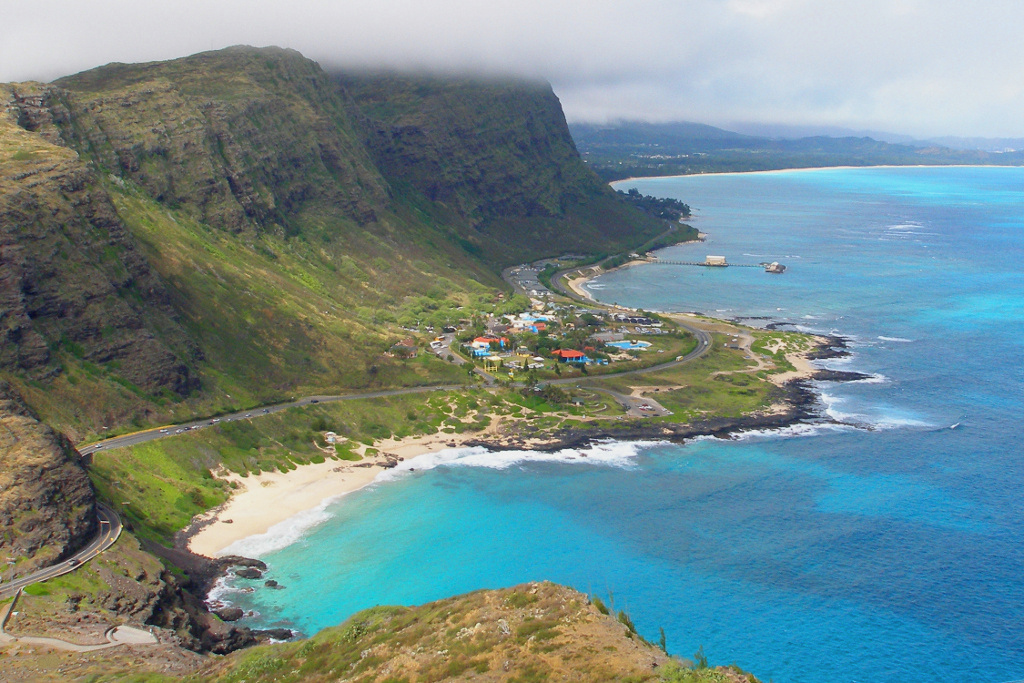
Makapuʻu Beach from Makapuʻu Point

- Makapuʻu Beach Park and Kaupō Beach Park – All of the rocky shoreline and pocket beaches between the sea cliffs at Makapuʻu Point and the State Research Pier (Makai Pier) are beach parks open to the public. Wave conditions at Kaupō (western end) are more suited to young beach-goers and poor swimmers. Makapuʻu Beach is a popular body-surfing beach, but the shore break can be dangerous.
- Makai Pier – A long, concrete pier built by the State of Hawaiʻi to support marine research efforts in the Hawaiian Islands. This pier houses several commercial marine engineering firms and HURL (Hawaiʻi Underwater Research Laboratory).
- Ka Iwi State Scenic Shoreline - The coastal area that extends from Makapuʻu Point Wayside to Sandy's Beach. Included in this section is Pele's Chair rock formation and the beach/swimming spot that shares the same name.
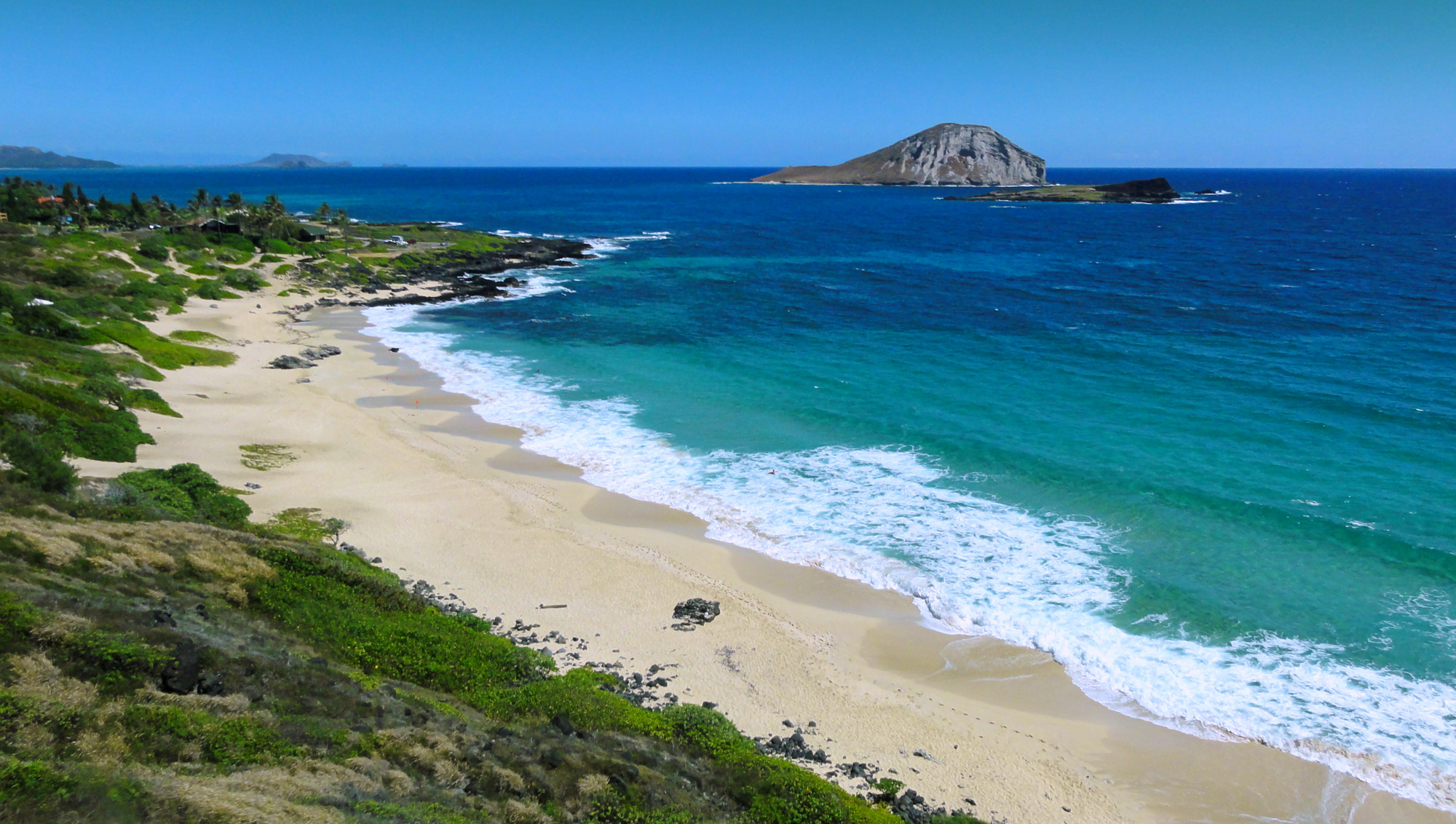
Makapuʻu Beach and Waimānalo Bay

Makapuʻu Point and lighthouse from Makapuʻu Beach

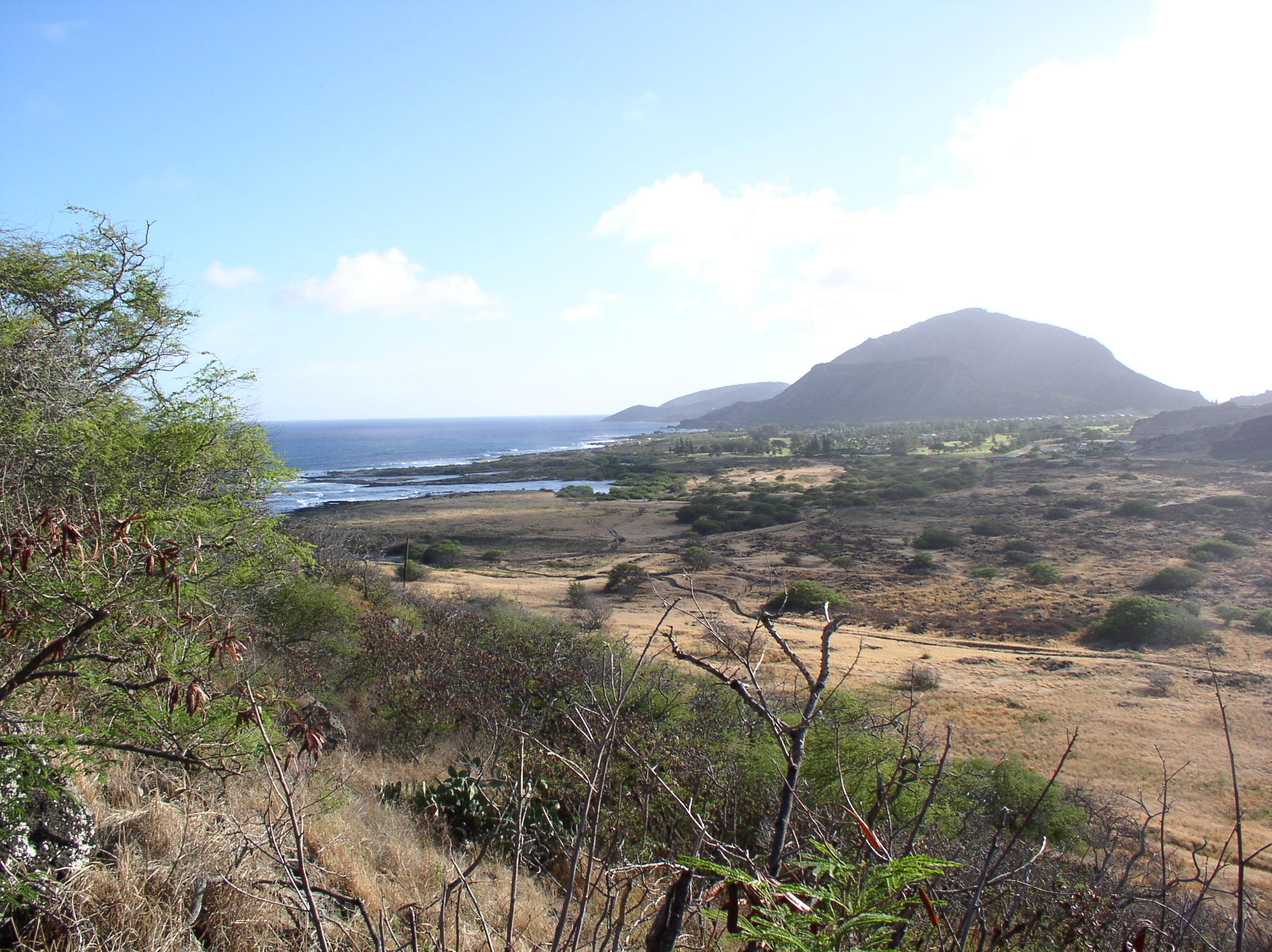
View of the Ka ʻIwi wilderness area from trail to Makapuʻu Point summit

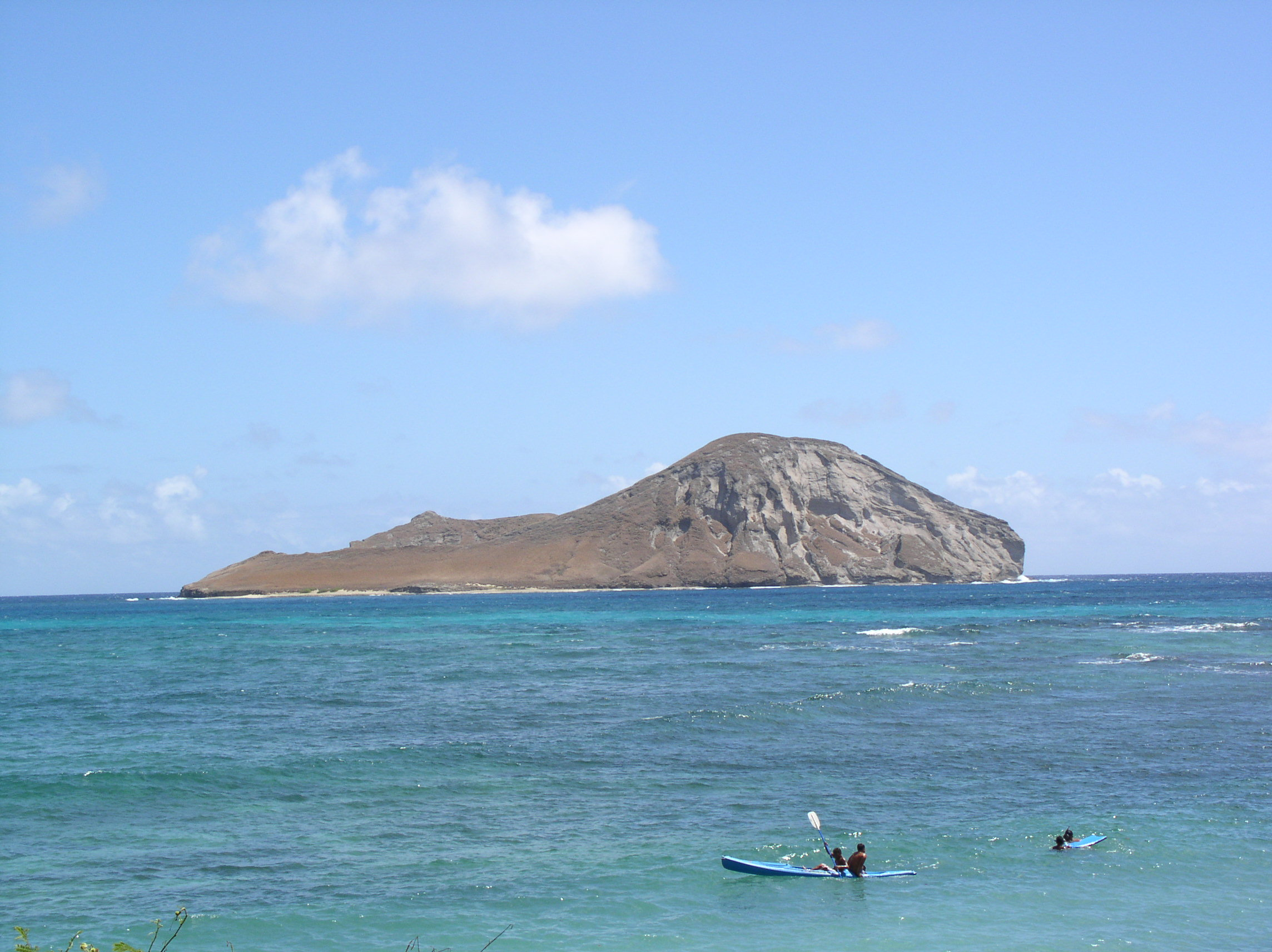
"Rabbit" Island: the emerging lop-eared rabbit is swimming to the right

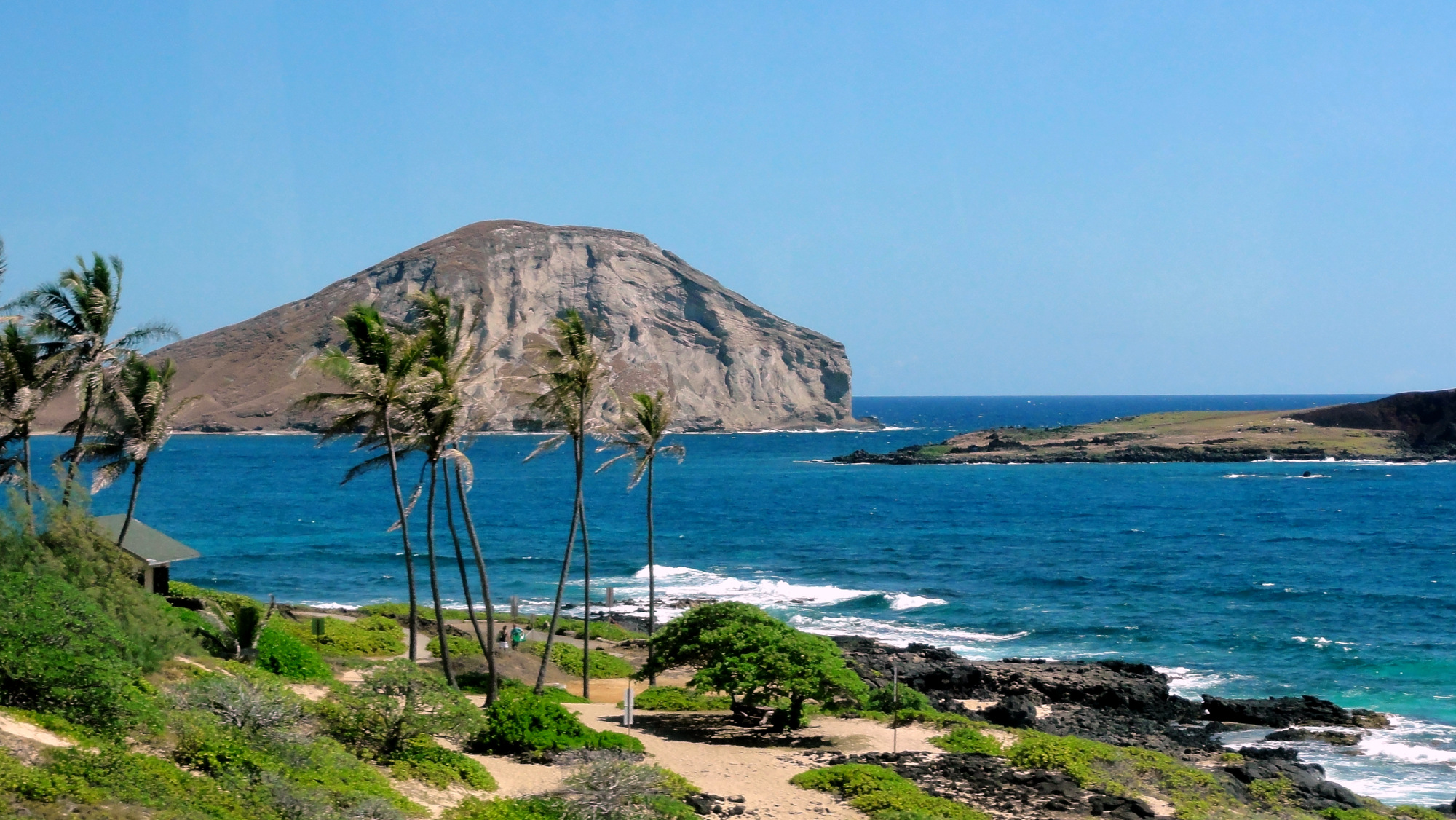
The islands across Makapuʻu

== See also ==
- List of Hawaiʻi state parks
