= Hyperradiant Fresnel lens =

Biform lighthouse lens design (1885–1920s)

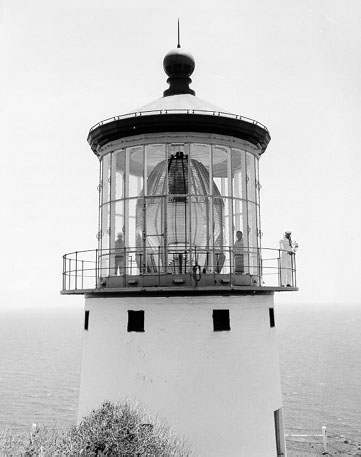
The lantern of Makapuu Point Light, showing the hyperradiant lens within; note the people on the gallery

Hyper-radial or hyperradiant Fresnel lenses are a type of Fresnel lensees used in lighthouses. They are larger than "first-order" lenses, having a focal length (radius) of 1330 mm (52.36 inches). The idea was mentioned by Thomas Stevenson in 1869 and first proposed by John Richardson Wigham in 1872, and again proposed by Thomas Stevenson in 1885 (infringing Wigham's patent).

The hyper-radial lens was made in 1885 by the F. Barbier Company in Paris as a test lens for the lighthouse illumination trials then going on at the South Foreland Lighthouse in the United Kingdom (UK). Chance Brothers Glass Company made their first hyper-radial lens in 1887 in the UK.

These lenses were originally named biform, and later triform and quadriform lenses, by Wigham. Thomas Stevenson used the term hyperradiant lens, and later they were renamed the hyper-radial lens by James Kenward of the Chance Brothers Glass Company.

The hyper-radial Fresnel lenses were the largest ever put into use and were installed in about two dozen major "landfall" beacons around the world. The recipients include Makapu'u Point lighthouse on Oahu Island in Hawaii, Cabo de São Vicente in Portugal, Manora Point in Karachi, Pakistan, the Bishop Rock off the coast of Cornwall (in the UK), Cabo de Santa Marta in Brazil, and Cape Race, Newfoundland. By the 1920s, high-intensity lamp technology had rendered lenses of this size obsolete.

== Lighthouses ==
Hyperradiant optics were installed in thirty-one lighthouses around the world. A large proportion were destined for lights around Great Britain and Ireland, with another four used at sites around Sri Lanka. Despite the improvements in lighting technology, a number are still in use. Others are in museums, either on display or in storage. The remainder have been broken up or lost.

Name	Image	Location Coordinates	Country	Company	Date	Notes
Barberyn		Barberyn; 6.4635°N 79.9683°E	Sri Lanka	Chance	1888	The optic gave a flash of white light every minute.
Bazaruto		Bazaruto Island; 21.5327°S 35.4861°E	Mozambique	Barbier et al.	1913	Still in situ, but badly damaged.
Beiyushan		Yushan Islands; 28.8842°N 122.2605°E	China	Barbier et al.	1895	Made up of four panels, "each lens panel has two partial bull's-eyes giving a double group-flashing characteristic". It is not in the lantern room anymore, the fate of the optic is not known.
Bell Rock		Inchcape; 56.4342°N 2.3873°W	Scotland	Henry Lepaute	1902	Lens removed in 1964. Made up of two panels, one panel is in the Signal Tower Museum, Arbroath. The location of the other panel is unknown.
Berlenga		Berlengas; 39.4133°N 9.5083°W	Portugal	Barbier et al.	1897	Made up of three panels, it was taken out of the tower in 1985. Two of the panels went to the Lighthouse Directorate Museum in Lisbon, one is on display, the other stored but damaged. The third was taken to the museum in the Santa Marta Lighthouse, Cascais.
Bishop Rock		Isle of Scilly; 49.8729°N 6.4457°W	United Kingdom	Chance	1887	Following automation in 1992 the bi-form lens was split, the lower tier remains in use, the upper tier is on display in the National Maritime Museum Cornwall.
Buchan Ness		Boddam, Aberdeenshire; 57.4704°N 1.7745°W	Scotland	Chance	1910	A combined first order and hyper-radial optic, taken out in 1978 and stored at the Museum of Scottish Lighthouses.
Bull Rock		Dursey Island; 51.5920°N 10.3010°W	Ireland	Barbier et al.	1888	Bi-form lens was removed in 1991 by the Commissioners of Irish Lights.
Cabo de São Vicente		Cape St. Vincent; 37.0231°N 8.9961°W	Portugal	Barbier et al.	1906	Still in situ and in use.
Cap d'Antifer		La Poterie-Cap-d'Antifer; 49.6835°N 0.1654°E	France	Barbier et al.	1894	Made up of six bullseye panels. It was lost when German soldiers demolished the entire lighthouse at the end of Occupation of France in August 1944.
Cape Race		Cape Race; 46.6587°N 53.0738°W	Canada	Chance	1907	Still in situ and in use.
Dondra Head		Dondra Head; 5.9213°N 80.5941°E	Sri Lanka	Chance	1888	The optic gave a flash of white light every twenty seconds.
Fair Isle North		Fair Isle; 59.5521°N 1.6098°W	Scotland	Barbier et al.	1892	Made up four panels, it was taken from the lighthouse in 1980. Presently in storage, Museum of Scottish Lighthouses, Fraserburgh.
Flannan Isles		Flannan Isle; 58.2881°N 7.5879°W	Scotland	Henry Lepaute	1899	Made up of two panels, in a clamshell configuration. Broken up in 1971, a fragment of one of the prisms is on display in the Museum of Scottish Lighthouses.
Great Basses Reef		Southern Province; 6.1821°N 81.4830°E	Sri Lanka	Chance	1888	Broken up in the 1960s.
Holy Isle		Hyskeir; 55.5173°N 5.0608°W	Scotland	Chance	1905	Fate unknown. Maker's plaque at The Museum of Scottish Lighthouses.
Hyskeir		Hyskeir; 56.9694°N 6.6804°W	Scotland	Chance	1904	Still in situ and in use.
Kinnaird Head		Kinnaird Head; 57.6977°N 2.0039°W	Scotland	Chance	1902	Still in situ in the original tower which is part of the Museum of Scottish Lighthouses, which has been superseded by a modern lighthouse.
Little Basses Reef		Southern Province; 6.4073°N 81.7302°E	Sri Lanka	Chance	1888	Broken up in the 1960s.
Makapuu Point		Oahu; 21.3099°N 157.6497°W	United States	Barbier et al.	1887	Still in situ and in use.
Manora Point		Manora; 24.7939°N 66.9775°E	Pakistan	Chance	1908	Made up of four bullseye panels, it is still in situ and in use.
Mew Island		Copeland Islands; 54.6986°N 5.5136°W	United Kingdom	Barbier et al.	1928	The original 1887 Tory Island tri-form lens was re-engineered to create a bi-form lens. Taken out in 2014, it was renovated and has been relocated to the Titanic Quarter in Belfast as a tourist attraction known as the Great Light.
Nólsoy		Nólsoy; 61.9573°N 6.6146°W	Faroe Islands	Barbier et al.	1893	Still in situ and in use.
Orfordness		Orford Ness; 52.0839°N 1.5742°E	United Kingdom	Chance	1909	Two secondary sector light panels, removed in 2014, as the tower is endangered by coastal erosion.
Pakri		Pakri Peninsula; 59.3874°N 24.0377°E	Estonia	Barbier et al.	1889	The lighthouse was badly damaged and the lens was lost in 1941 during World War II.
Pladda		Pladda; 55.4251°N 5.1184°W	Scotland	Chance	1901	Made up of three bullseye panels, it was taken out of the tower, but its location is unknown. Reportedly moved to the Arran Heritage Museum.
Round Island		Isles of Scilly; 49.9790°N 6.3231°W	United Kingdom	Chance	1888	Bi-form, each tier made up of six panels. Removed in 1966, location not known.
Rua Reidh		Wester Ross; 57.8588°N 5.8117°W	Scotland	Chance	1909	Made up of six panels. Removed in 1985, on display at Gairloch Heritage Museum.
Santa Marta		Laguna; 28.6033°S 48.8133°W	Brazil	Barbier et al.	1891	Still in situ and in use.
Spurn Point		Spurn; 53.5789°N 0.1183°E	United Kingdom	Chance	1895	Location not known. Made up of six lens panels it was removed in 1957 when the lighthouse was automated.
Sule Skerry		Sule Skerry; 59.0847°N 4.4073°W	Scotland	Barbier et al.	1895	Removed in 1977 and stored at the National Museum of Scotland.
Tory Island		Tory Island; 55.2730°N 8.2490°W	Ireland	Chance	1887	Original 1887 tri-form was re-engineered by dividing up the bullseye panels, and creating a new bi-form optic for use at Mew Island in 1928. The second set of panels were used to create a second bi-form optic that is still in situ and in use.
