= Lighthouse of Cabo de São Vicente =

Lighthouse in Portugal

Lighthouse of Cabo de São Vicente Farol do Cabo de São Vicente
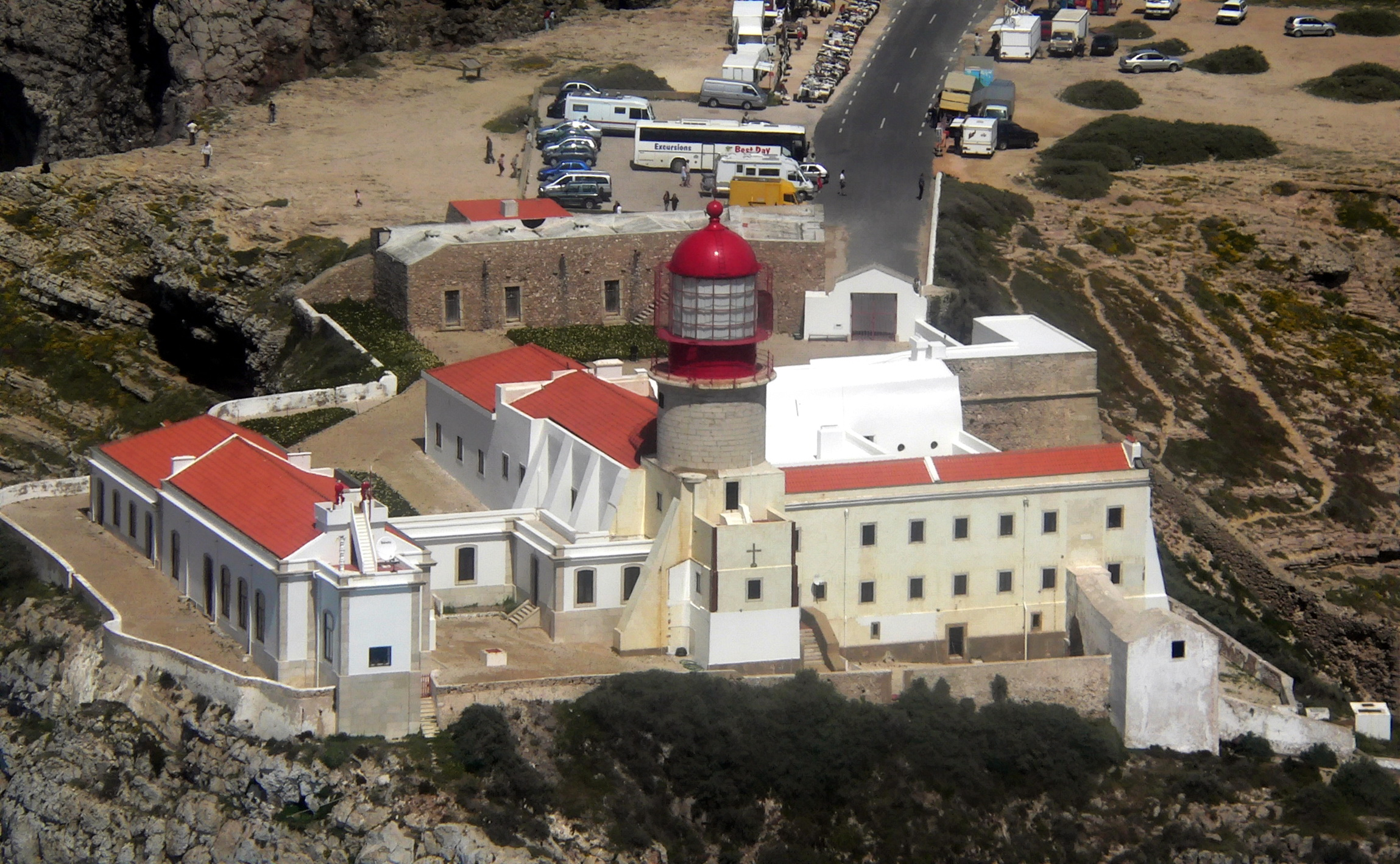
- A view of the reinforced structure of the old convent and lighthouse of Cape St. Vicente
- Location: Portugal Vila do Bispo, Sagres
- Coordinates: 37°1′23″N 8°59′46.1″W

Tower
- Constructed: 1500
- Construction: Round cylindrical stone tower with lantern and gallery, rising from a 2- and 3-story keeper's complex
- Automated: 1982
- Height: 28 metres (92 ft)
- Operator: Directorate for Lighthouses (Direcção de Faróis)
- Heritage: Unclassified

Light
- First lit: 1846
- Focal height: 86 metres (282 ft)
- Lens: Fresnel lens
- Range: 32 nautical miles (59 km)
- Characteristic: Fl W 5s
- Portugal no.: PT-436

The Lighthouse of Cabo de São Vicente (Portuguese: Farol do Cabo de São Vicente) is a beacon/lighthouse located along the coastal peninsula of Sagres Point in the civil parish of Sagres, in the Portuguese municipality of the Vila do Bispo. It is not to be confused with the Lighthouse of Ponta de Sagres, which is located further to the edge of the extreme southwest cape of the civil parish, southwest of the Fortress of Sagres.

== History ==
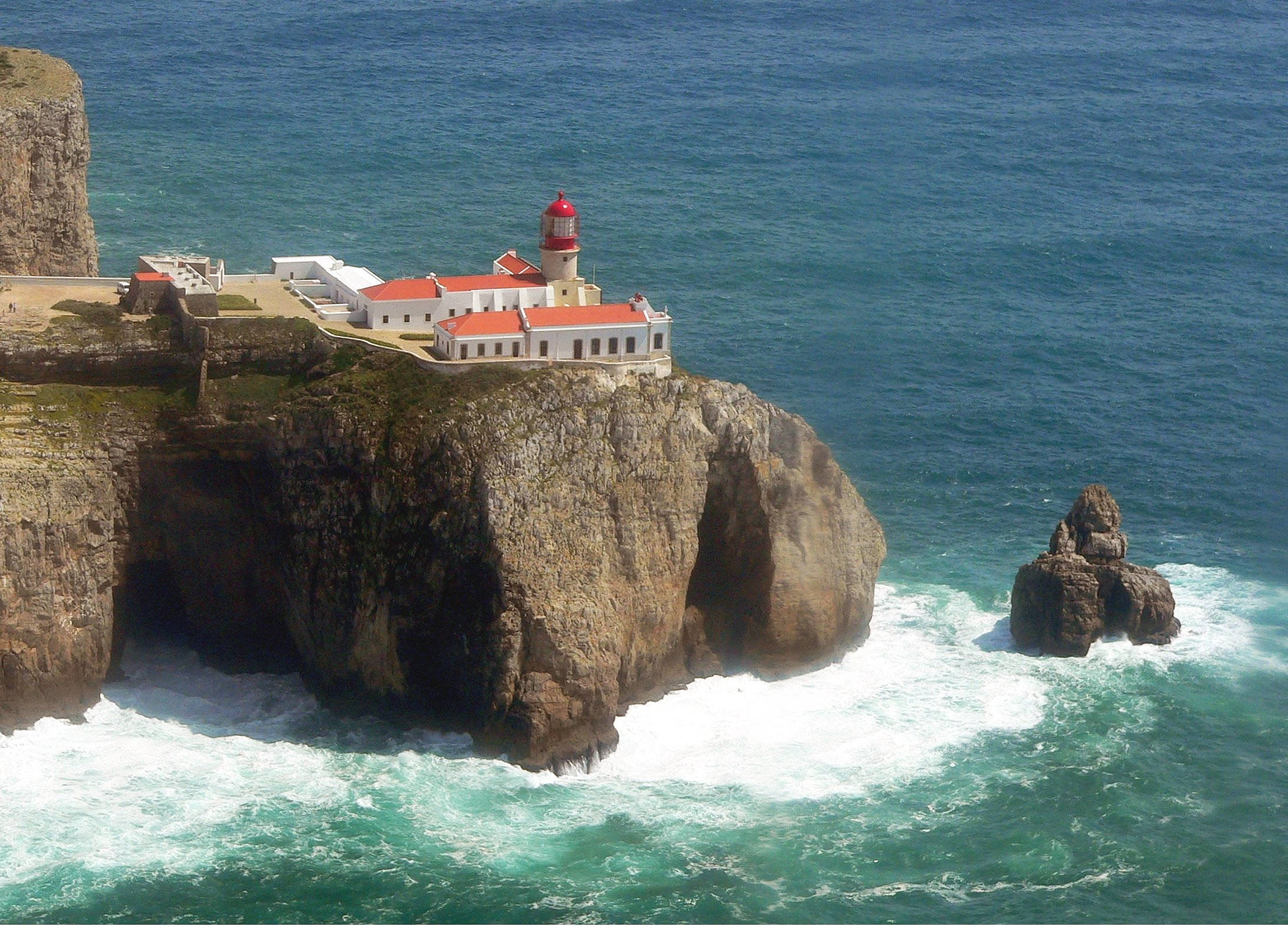
The cliffs off the Cape of St. Vincent showing the position of the lighthouse/convent

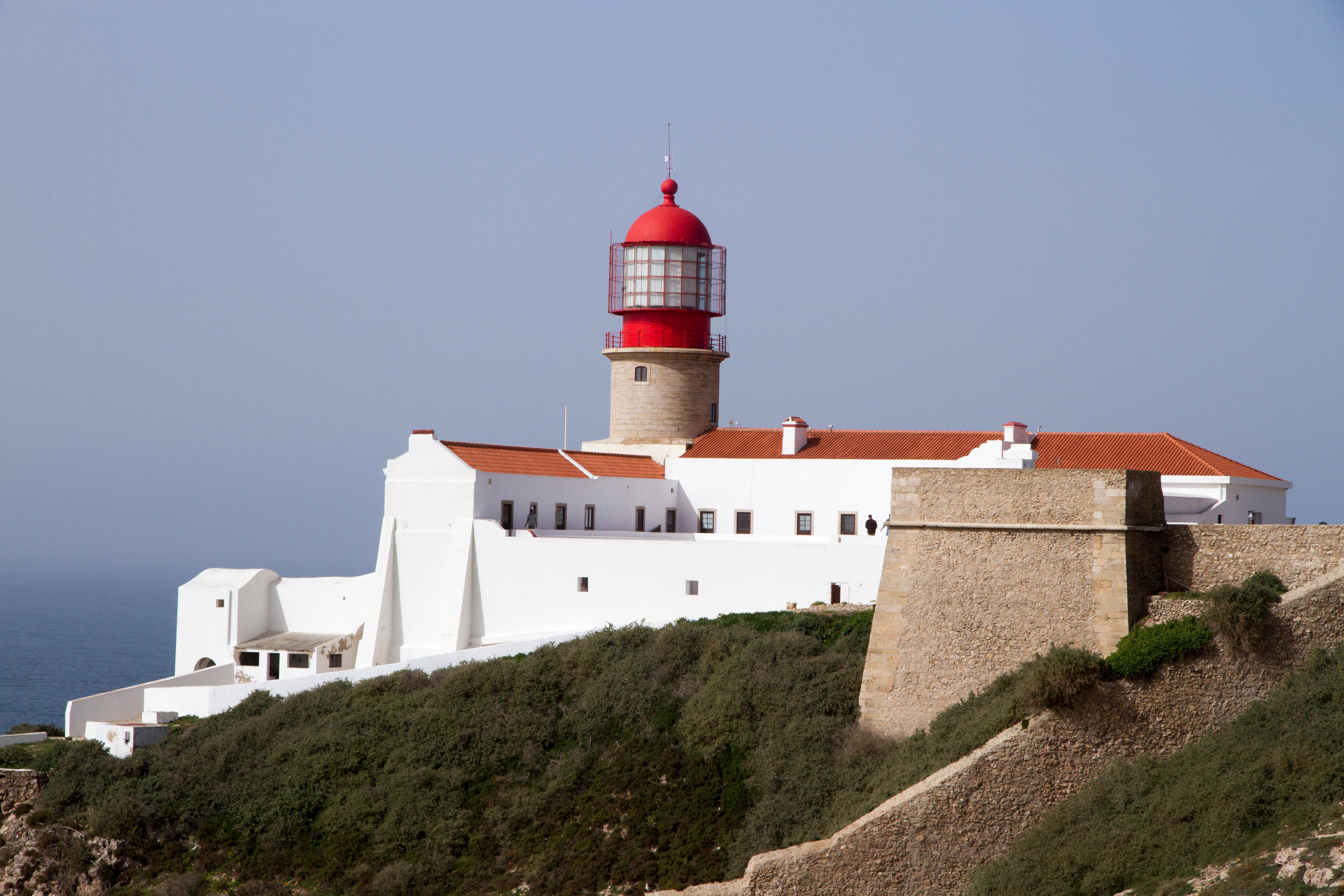
A profile view of the lighthouse and convent structure from the southwestern cliff

A rudimentary lighthouse existed on the cape since 1520, in a special tower constructed on the site of the convent. Between 1521 and 1557 a tower was ordered constructed by King D. John III to defend the coast from attacks from marauding soldiers. Yet, in 1587, the tower was destroyed by the English privateer Francis Drake, and only returned to operation in 1606, following its restoration by order of King Phillip II.

The lighthouse of Cape St. Vincente, or the Lighthouse of D. Fernando, was ordered to be constructed by Queen D. Maria II, and began operating in October 1846, in the 16th-century Franciscan convent. It was originally illuminated by an olive oil lamp consisting of two clarions that rotated every two seconds, and a range of 6 nautical miles (11 km; 6.9 mi).

Following an initial period of operation, the lighthouse was abandoned and almost fell into ruin; a survey of the site indicated its deplorable state by 1865. Due to its state and poor performance of its light, work began on remodeling the structure in 1897. The tower was increased 5.7 metres (19 ft), and its optic was replaced with a new mechanism. Work on the site lasted 11 years, and in 1908 the lighthouse began operating with a 1,330-millimetre (52 in) Fresnel lens, making it one of the largest optics used in Portuguese lighthouses and one of the 10 largest in the world. It consisted of three 8-square-metre (86 sq ft) panels with 313 kilograms (690 lb) of mercury. The original beacon installed had a constant five rotations, but was replaced by an incandescent gas lamp. Its rotation was maintained with a clockwork system, allowing it to have a periodicity of 15 seconds and a range of 33 miles (53 km).

In 1914, a signal horn was installed. In 1926, a generator was installed, permitting an easy transition from petrol to electricity.

Due to the necessities of the Second World War, in 1947 deflector panels were installed, allowing the lighthouse to function both for terrestrial and maritime navigation. The following year, it was finally connected to the public electrical grid.

In 1982, the lighthouse was automated and, at the same time, it began to control the neighbouring lighthouse in the adjacent cape, supporting a small staff on duty. Following the remodeling in 1990, the optic's rotation was automated in 2001.

== Architecture ==
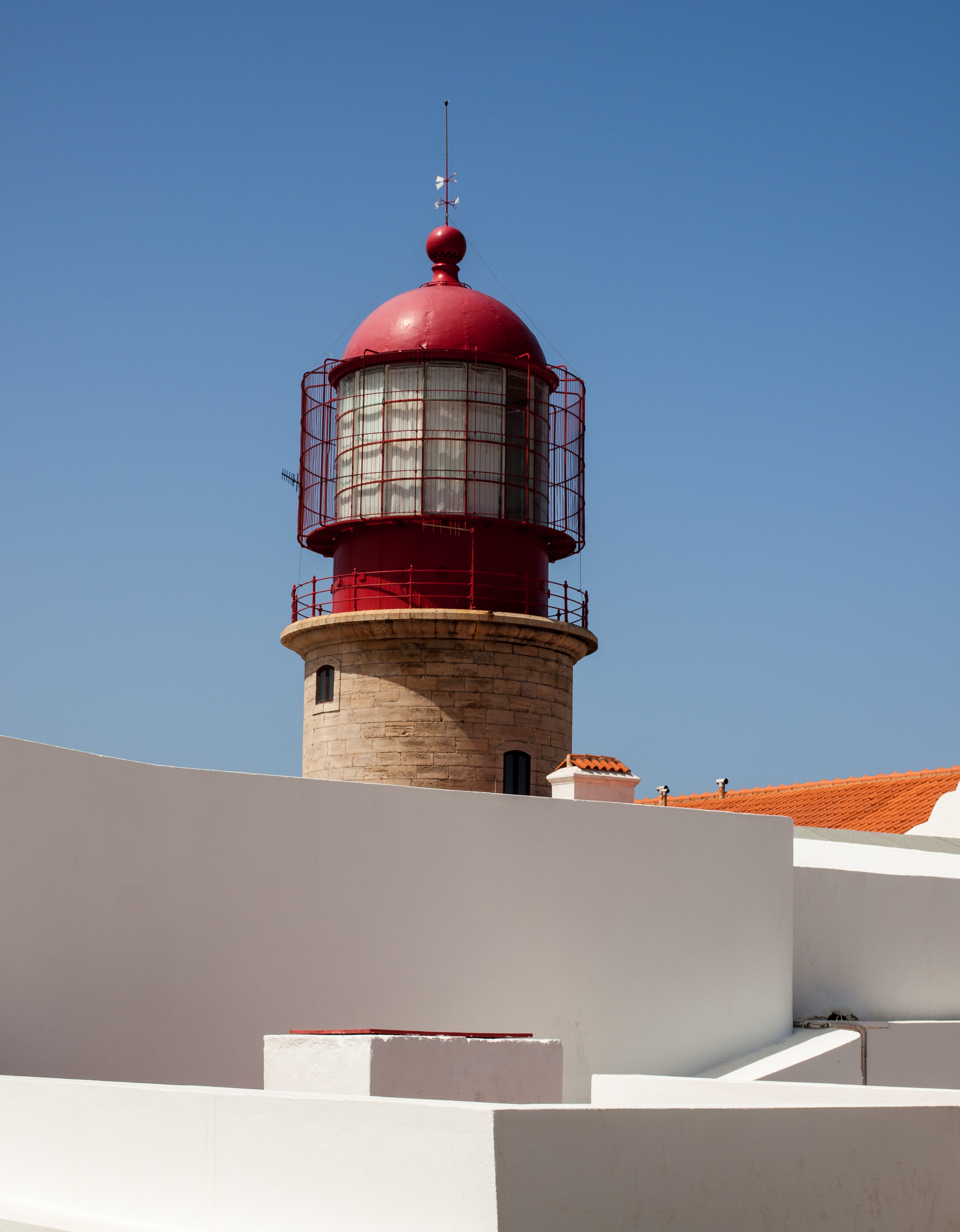
The visible portion of the lighthouse from the interior courtyard of the convent

The lighthouse is situated on the tip of the Cape of St. Vincent, located 7 km (4.3 mi) from the western edge of the civil parish of Sagres, guarding one of the world's busiest shipping lanes. The traditional land's end of Europe, the extreme southwesternmost point on the continent, it was an essential landfall for sailors returning from Africa and the Americas. One of the most powerful lighthouses in Europe (the most powerful being Phare du Creach on the French island of Ushant, off the coast of Brittany); its two 1,000 W lamps can be seen as far as 60 km (37 mi) away.

The 28-metre (92 ft) round cylindrical stone tower, with lantern and gallery, rises from a 2-/3-story keeper's complex. The beacon itself has operated with a hyper-radiant Fresnel lens (larger than 1st order) since 1908, with a focal plane of 86 metres (282 ft) and demonstrating one quick white flash every 5 seconds. The unpainted lighthouse tower includes a red-painted lantern and the keeper's white-painted house with a red roof. A fog horn gives two 5-second blasts every 30 seconds.

Its position at land's end attracts visitors annually, and the Portuguese Navy constructed a visitor center and museum on the site.

=== Access and visits ===
The lighthouse complex, including the courtyard, maritime museum, restaurant, souvenir shops, and sanitary facilities, is closed to all public visits until further notice due to operational issues (confirmed June 2026). The cape, surrounding cliffs and headland remain accessible 24 hours a day, free of charge. Free parking is available at the lighthouse. Outside the complex walls, several independent food stalls and food trucks continue to operate, offering street food to visitors.

== See also ==
- Cape St. Vincent
- Lighthouse of Ponta de Sagres
- List of lighthouses in Portugal
