= Makapuʻu Point Light =

Makapuu Point Light
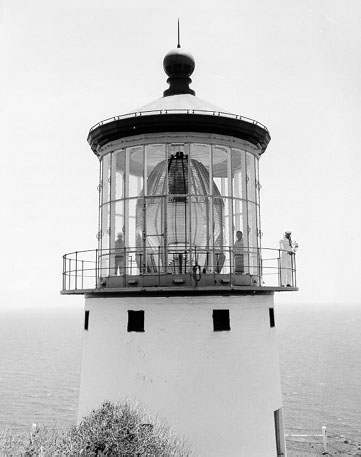
- Makapuʻu Point Light (USCG) undated archival photograph (note the men in the picture)
- Location: southeast point of Oahu
- Coordinates: 21.309889°N 157.649748°W

Tower
- Constructed: 1909
- Foundation: masonry basement
- Construction: brick tower
- Automated: 1974
- Height: 46 feet (14 m)
- Shape: cylindrical tower with balcony and lantern
- Markings: white tower, red lantern roof and gray trim and parapet.
- Operator: United States Coast Guard
- Heritage: National Register of Historic Places listed place

Light
- First lit: 1909
- Focal height: 420 feet (130 m)
- Lens: hyperradiant Fresnel lens
- Intensity: 115,000 candlepower white
- Range: 19 nautical miles (35 km; 22 mi)
- Characteristic: Oc W 10s,
- U.S. Coast Guard Makapuu Point Light
- U.S. National Register of Historic Places
- Nearest city: Waimanalo, Hawaii
- Architect: U.S. Coast Guard
- NRHP reference No.: 77000447
- Added to NRHP: December 7, 1977

The Makapuʻu Point Light on the island of Oʻahu has the largest lens of any lighthouse in the United States. It was listed on the National Register of Historic Places in 1977.

== History ==
Before this light was constructed, the location was considered to be of vital importance to maritime commerce, and greatly in need of a navigational aid.

Makapuʻu Point is the southeasternmost point of Oahu (in the Makapuʻu region) and the landfall for all traffic from the American west coast to Honolulu. With the 1887 Constitution of the Kingdom of Hawaii, which began definite steps towards annexation, shipping interests began to clamor for a lighthouse at the point, beginning with an 1888 petition. In 1890 Lorrin A. Thurston, minister of the interior for the kingdom, directed that inquiries be made with a British firm for a lens and other equipment. The light remained stuck in the planning stage, however, until after annexation, and indeed until 1906, when the United States House of Representatives passed a bill with an appropriation for construction.

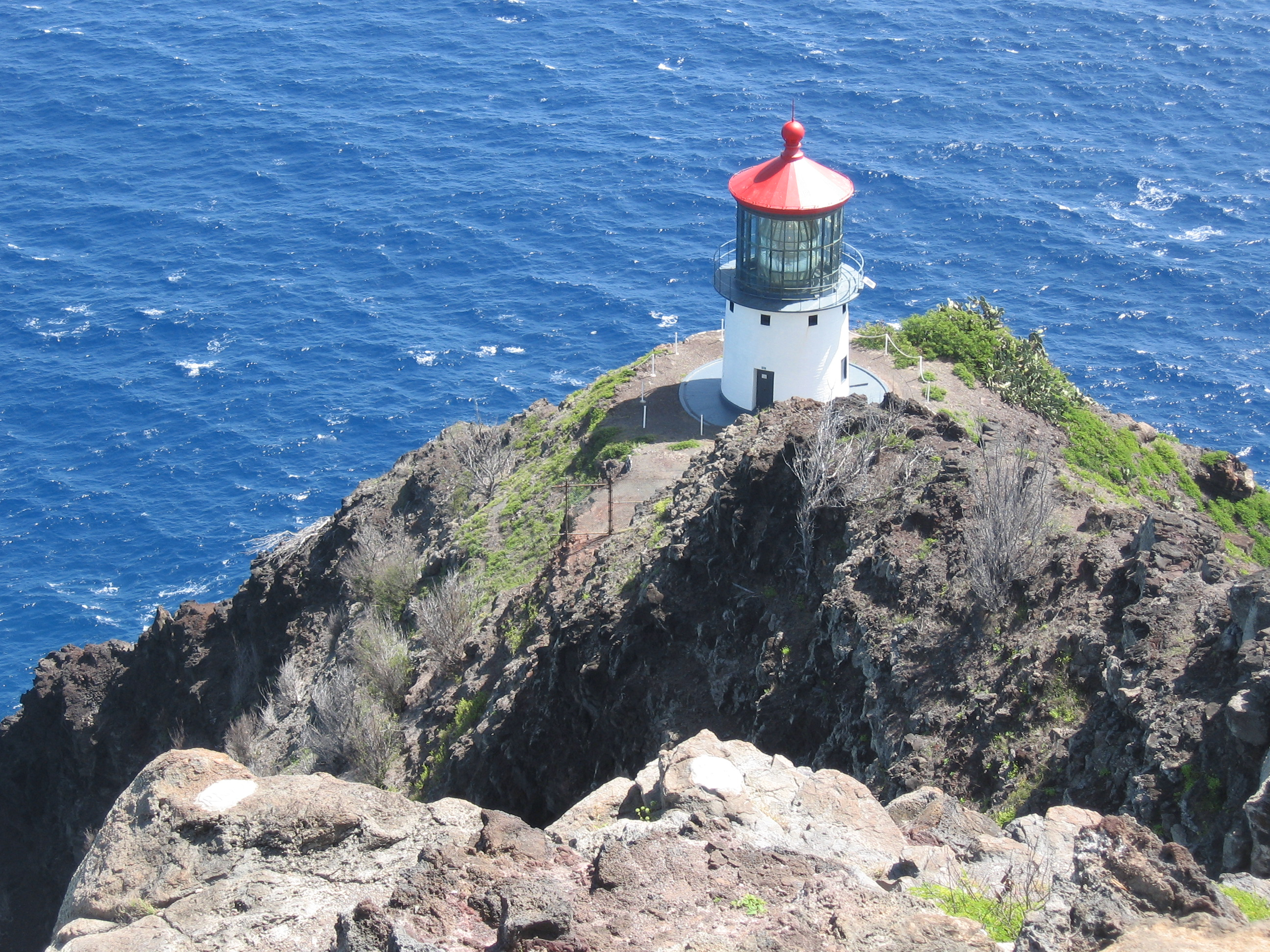
The light from the hiking trail

In the interim, the size of the planned optic grew considerably. Thurston's original request was met with a specification for a third-order Fresnel lens, but as time passed plans were upgraded to use a second-order, and then a first-order lens.

At the 1893 World's Columbian Exposition in Chicago (or "Chicago World's Fair"), the United States Lighthouse Board displayed "its 'state of the art' wares and engineering achievements." Prominently featured was "the engineering marvel" of Spectacle Reef Light and a 111-foot-tall (34 m) skeletal cast iron lighthouse tower (reassembled as the Waackaack Rear Range Light off the shore of Keansburg, New Jersey, after the exposition).

Also displayed were a number of Fresnel lenses, including a stunning third-order Fresnel lens that had been awarded first prize at a Paris glass exhibition. The lens featured alternating red and white panels, and had been ordered for installation in the Point Loma lighthouse in California. The coincidental conclusion of construction of the new Chicago Harbor Light and the close of the Exhibition prompted the Lighthouse Board to keep the lens in Chicago. The lens was installed in the lantern room of the new tower in Chicago, where it remained for nearly 100 years.

Also displayed at the fair was a hyperradiant Fresnel lens – the largest size ever made, "off the chart" of sixth through first Order. This lens was on hand when it was decided to build and outfit the Makapuʻu Point Light. Rather than order a new lens, the huge optic construction – twelve feet tall and with over a thousand prisms – would be used at the new Makapuʻu Point Light. Makapuʻu Point Light thereby became the only U.S. light with such a lens, and ever since its activation in 1909, it has had the distinction of having the largest lens in U.S. service.

In addition to being the largest lens in the United States at the time of its construction, this was the second highest focal plane, after Cape Mendocino Light in California, which is at 422 feet (129 m). It is now the third highest light in the U.S., behind the 462-foot (141 m) Old Point Loma lighthouse and Cape Mendocino. It is still an active aid to navigation.

Originally, the light was provided with a three-mantle oil vapor lamp. To start the lamp, a supplementary alcohol burner was required, and this was the source of a tragedy in 1925. The first and second assistant keepers were changing watches in the wee hours of April 25 when the former suggested to the latter that the alcohol reservoir be filled. This was accomplished, but some of the alcohol spilled. The first assistant lit a match, triggering an explosion. The second assistant was standing in the doorway and escaped serious injury, but the first assistant, Alexander Toomey, was badly burned and died the next day. His pregnant wife gave birth to a daughter shortly thereafter, and three months later she, too, died.

Two years later the lighthouse was equipped with a radio beacon, the first in Hawaii. As this required a generating station, the lamp was changed from oil vapor to a 500W incandescent bulb. The light was automated in 1974, the radiobeacon having been discontinued the previous year. Shortly thereafter the lighthouse keeper's quarters were used to house witnesses in the federal tax evasion case of Wilford "Nappy" Pulawa.

The isolated location left the buildings vulnerable to vandalism, including a 1984 incident in which a hole was shot in the lens. In 1987 the Coast Guard declared much of the land around the light surplus, and it was turned over to the State of Hawaii. One of the buildings was then seized by an armed group of native Hawaiians as part of a land ownership protest; after several weeks, however, the squatters were evicted without bloodshed, and buildings were razed. The light remains in control of the Coast Guard, surrounded by state-owned land; the trail leads to the light, and it is a popular destination for hikers.

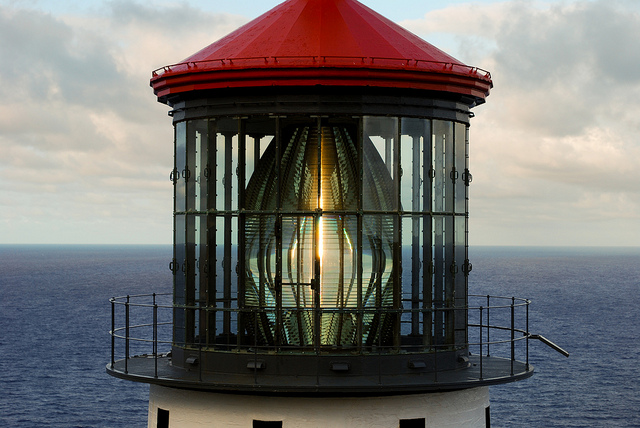
Makapuu-Lighthouse-Oahu-Hawaii

The light is marked as white with red lantern. However, it used to be marked with a black lantern, and some sources erroneously indicate that as the present markings.

The lighthouse sits high on a volcanic point. The rocky cliffs are popular with hang gliders.

== See also ==
- List of lighthouses in Hawaii
