= Cape Race Lighthouse =

Lighthouse on Newfoundland, Canada

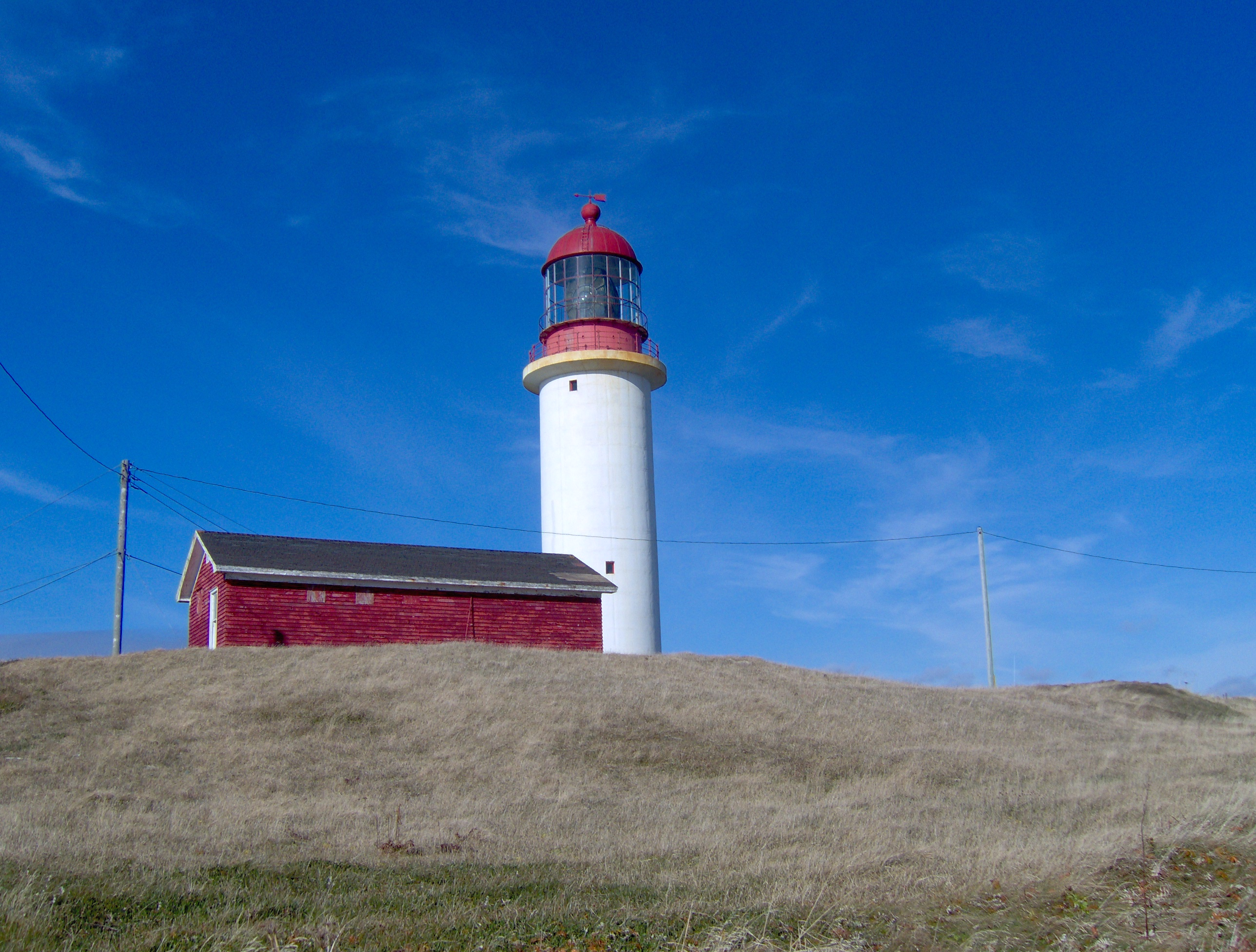
- The second Cape Race Lighthouse from 1907
- Location: Avalon Peninsula; Newfoundland and Labrador; Canada
- Coordinates: 46°39′31.2″N 53°04′25.6″W

Tower
- Constructed: 1856 (first) relocated in 1980 to Ottawa at Canada Science and Technology Museum
- Construction: concrete tower
- Height: 29 metres (95 ft)
- Shape: cylindrical tower with balcony and lantern
- Markings: white tower, red lantern
- Operator: Cape Race National Historic Site
- Heritage: national Historic Sites of Canada, recognized federal heritage building of Canada, heritage lighthouse
- Fog signal: Horn (2) 60s

Light
- First lit: 1907 (current)
- Focal height: 52 metres (171 ft)
- Lens: Hyperradiant Fresnel lens by Chance Brothers
- Range: 24 nautical miles (44 km; 28 mi)
- Characteristic: Fl W 7.5s

National Historic Site of Canada
- Official name: Cape Race Lighthouse National Historic Site of Canada
- Designated: 1975

Cape Race Lighthouse is an active lighthouse located at Cape Race on the Avalon Peninsula, Newfoundland, Canada. The light's characteristic is a single white flash every 7.5 seconds; additionally, a foghorn may sound a signal of two blasts every 60 seconds. It is located on one of Canada's busiest shipping lanes. The lighthouse is also a tourist attraction.

== History ==
In 1856, the first lighthouse was installed by the British Government's Trinity House. It was a cast iron tower with a coal oil lamp turned by clockwork. In 1872, the lighthouse keeper was Patrick Myrick; members of his family continued to operate the lighthouse for more than 100 years. In 1886, responsibility for operation of the lighthouse was transferred to the Government of Canada.

In 1904, the Marconi Company set up a wireless radio station at the lighthouse. The cast iron tower was replaced in 1907 by a 29-metre-tall (95 ft) concrete tower and a light with a massive hyperradiant Fresnel lens made by Chance Brothers in England. Its optic emitted a one million candle power flash. Great landfall lights like those at Cape Race provided the first sight of land for Atlantic travelers.

After the new tower was built, the original lighthouse was moved to Cape North; it now stands in front of the National Science and Technology Museum in Ottawa.

The Cape Race Lighthouse was in the news in April 1912, when it received the Titanic distress call, an unusual event for radio technology of the era.

The lighthouse was designated a National Historic Site of Canada in 1975.

In 2006, David Myrick, with help from Noel and Liam Myrick—part of a lineage of Myrick lighthouse keepers at Cape Race—contributed wood from the cabinet housing the motor driving the Fresnel to the Six String Nation project. Part of this material serves as the heel brace at the joint of the neck and body of Voyageur, the guitar at the heart of the project.

As of 2020, the lighthouse keeper was Clifford Doran.

== See also ==
- List of lighthouses in Newfoundland and Labrador
- List of lighthouses in Canada
