= Orient Point Light =

Lighthouse off Long Island, New York

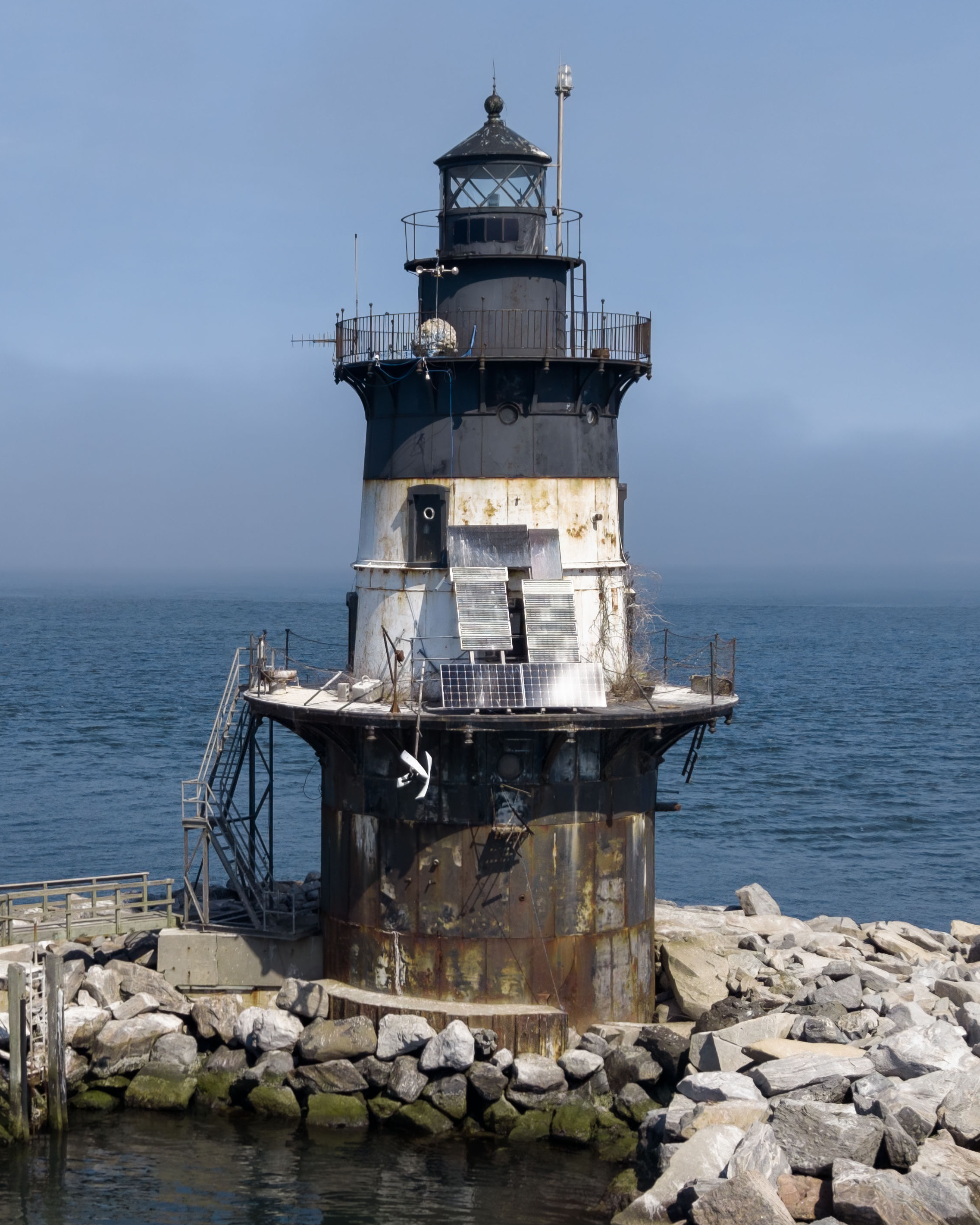
- (2026)
- Location: Off Orient point, north eastern tip of Long Island, NY, Oyster pond reef, Plum gut
- Coordinates: 41°9′48.393″N 72°13′25.014″W

Tower
- Constructed: 1899
- Foundation: Cast iron caisson
- Construction: Cast iron plate with brick lining
- Automated: 1954
- Height: 16 m (52 ft)
- Shape: Black conical tower with white band in center, "Spark plug"
- Heritage: National Register of Historic Places listed place
- Fog signal: HORN: 2 blasts ev 30s (2s bl-2s si-2s bl-24s si).

Light
- First lit: 1899
- Focal height: 64 feet (20 m)
- Lens: Fifth order Fresnel lens 1899 (original), Optic (current)
- Range: 17 nautical miles (31 km; 20 mi)
- Characteristic: Fixed white light
- Orient Point Light Station
- U.S. National Register of Historic Places
- Nearest city: Orient, New York
- Area: less than one acre
- Architect: U.S. Lighthouse Board
- MPS: Light Stations of the United States MPS
- NRHP reference No.: 06001229
- Added to NRHP: January 9, 2007

Orient Point Light is a sparkplug lighthouse off Orient Point, New York in Plum Gut of Long Island Sound – the deep and narrow gap between Orient Point and Plum Island. It was built in 1899 and was automated in 1954. The lighthouse was listed on the National Register of Historic Places in 2007.

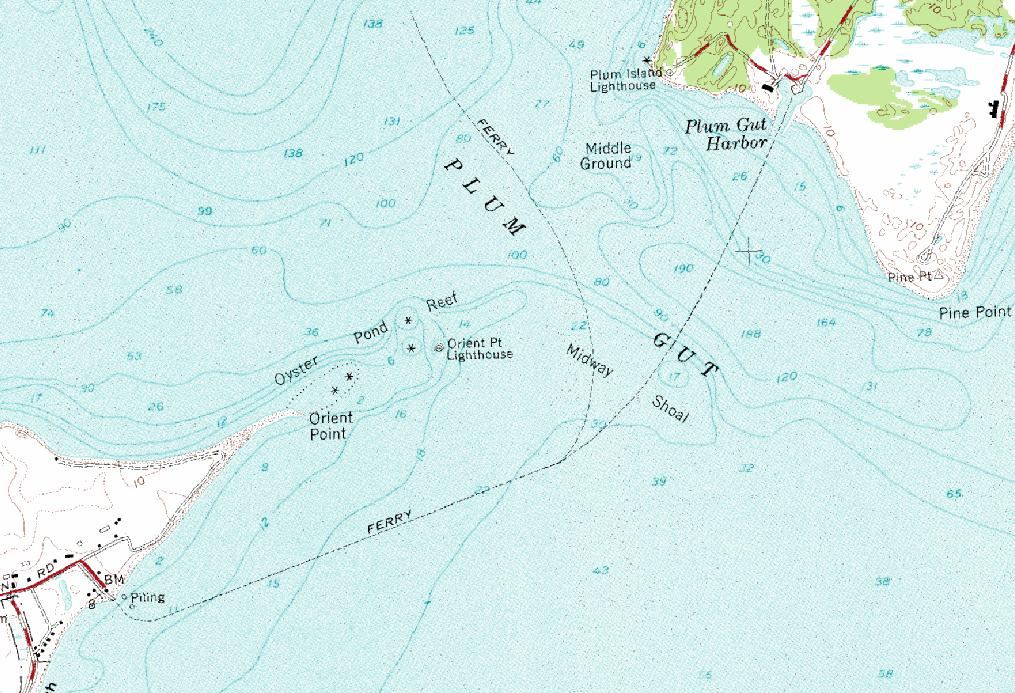
Detail of USGS Map, Orient Point Light is in the center

The lighthouse was sold as excess property in 2013, and is owned by artist Randy Polumbo.

== History ==
The United States Lighthouse Service placed a daymarker at the site in 1855, announcing that it would be replaced by a beacon, but its completion was delayed by the hardness of the rock and a nighttime collision into the temporary staging by a trading vessel. A stone beacon in the shape of a pyramid with a shaft and iron cage was placed on the rock in 1874, but was carried away by ice in 1896.

Construction of a cast-iron caisson tower on the reef began in October 1898 but was halted for a year by stormy weather. Construction began again in the spring, and by September, most of the project was in place. The lamp was lit on November 10, 1899, but the fifth-order Fresnel lens proved to be too weak and was replaced by a fourth order lens on May 1, 1900. A fog signal went into operation of June 1 of that year, and was upgraded in 1905.

The lighthouse tower is 45 feet (14 m) tall and has six interior decks. A breakwall was added over the next three years to protect the structure, adding 9,000 tons of riprap to the original 803 tons, creating a 25 feet (7.6 m) island that rises 32 feet (9.8 m) from the bottom. Cracks and rust on one side of the tower required additional cast-iron plates to repair, and the additional weight caused the tower to tilt about five degrees out of vertical; possibly assisted by current undermining the foundation on that side as well.

The steamship Halyoke missed hitting the lighthouse on August 30, 1912, when its steering went out. Although the current headed the ship directly at the light, the captain put the engines into full reverse, and the ship ran up on the rock but then backed up. No damage was done to the ship or the lighthouse.

On April 5, 1958, the lighthouse was automated, and in 1970 the Coast Guard announced its plans to tear it down. Popular sentiment saved the lighthouse from this fate, and the Coast Guard reversed its decision. Instead, repairs were made: additional concrete for the base, and a new coat of paint and epoxy preservative. The lens was replaced in 1988, and additional major repair work took place in 2000, including the installation of solar panels and batteries.

In June 2011, the General Services Administration made the Orient Point Light, along with 11 others, available at no cost to public organizations willing to preserve them. When no suitable caretaker organization was found, an auction was held in 2011 in which the high bidder failed to provide a required additional deposit; a second auction followed in 2013. The lighthouse was purchased on September 18, 2013, by sculptor Randy Polumbo with a high bid of $252,000. Polumbo, the founder of the eco-construction company Plant, converted part of the lighthouse's interior into an artist's residency he calls "Plum Gut Grotto". According to Polumbo, the lighthouse has structural issues: part of the base is missing, allowing water to seep in.

== In popular culture ==
The Archives Center at the Smithsonian National Museum of American History has a collection (#1055) of souvenir postcards of lighthouses and has digitized 272 of these and made them available online. These include postcards of Orient Point Light with links to customized nautical charts provided by National Oceanographic and Atmospheric Administration.
