= List of shipwrecks in February 1851 =

The list of shipwrecks in February 1851 includes ships sunk, foundered, wrecked, grounded, or otherwise lost during February 1851.

== 1 February ==
List of shipwrecks: 1 February 1851
Ship	State	Description
Brandtaucher	German Confederation	An experimental hand-cranked military submarine sunk due to hull breach, caused by ballast shifting uncontrollably due to the instability of the vessel. The crew escaped through the hatch after allowing the flooding to equalize the internal pressure with the external pressure of the water.
Catarina	Ottoman Empire	The ship was wrecked near Cape St. Angelo. She was on a voyage from Galaţi to Cork or Falmouth, Cornwall, United Kingdom.
Delphine	France	The ship was wrecked near Penmarc'h, Finistère. Her crew were rescued. She was on a voyage from Douarnenez, Finistère to Bordeaux, Gironde.
Honor	United Kingdom	The ship was driven ashore at Ballyferris Point, County Down. She was on a voyage from Liverpool, Lancashire to Saint Domingo. She was refloated and taken in to Millisle.
Peter Hattrick	United Kingdom	The full-rigged ship was in collision with Quebec (United Kingdom) in the English Channel off Hastings, Sussex, United Kingdom and was severely damaged. She was on a voyage from Apalachicola, Florida to Antwerp, Belgium. She was towed in to Portsmouth, Hampshire, United Kingdom by the tug Echo (United Kingdom) and was drydocked for repairs.
Sandford	United Kingdom	The brigantine ran aground on the Dutchman's Bank, in the Irish Sea. She was on a voyage from Liverpool to Messina, Sicily. She was later refloated.

== 2 February ==
List of shipwrecks: 2 February 1851
Ship	State	Description
Ellen	United Kingdom	The ship was driven ashore near Bale, Ireland. She was on a voyage from Tralee, County Kerry to London. She was refloated on 16 February and taken into Kilrush, County Clare.
Hope	United Kingdom	The schooner ran aground on the East Barrow Sand, in the North Sea off the coast of Essex. She was on a voyage from Newcastle upon Tyne, Northumberland to Palma de Mallorca, Spain. She was refloated on 4 February with assistance from five smacks and taken in to Wivenhoe, Essex in a leaky condition.

== 3 February ==
List of shipwrecks: 3 February 1851
Ship	State	Description
Absorus	United Kingdom	The ship was driven ashore and wrecked between Messina and the Punta del Faro, Sicily. She was on a voyage from the Black Sea to an English port.
Agenoria	United Kingdom	The ship was driven ashore at Wexford. She was on a voyage from Liverpool, Lancashire to Wexford. She had become a wreck by 6 February.
Amelia	France	The ship ran aground and was wrecked "on the Have". She was on a voyage from Bordeaux, Gironde to Honfleur, Calvados and Cherbourg, Seine-Inférieure.
Eleanor	United Kingdom	The ship ran aground on the Shipwash Sand, in the North Sea off the coast of Suffolk. She was on a voyage from Hartlepool, County Durham to London. She was refloated and resumed her voyage.

== 4 February ==
List of shipwrecks: 4 February 1851
Ship	State	Description
Absorus	Russia	The ship was driven ashore between Messina and the Punta del Faro, Sicily. Her crew were rescued. She was on a voyage from the Levant to an English port.
Blanche	United Kingdom	The ship ran aground at Liverpool, Lancashire. She was on a voyage from Saint John, New Brunswick, British North America to Liverpool. She was refloated the next day and taken into Liverpool in a severely damaged condition.
Bonne Elise	France	The ship was driven ashore and wrecked between Messina and the Punta del Faro, Sicily. She was on a voyage from Smyrna, Ottoman Empire to Marseille, Bouches-du-Rhône.
Brothers	United Kingdom	The ship was wrecked at Laxey, Isle of Man.
Elizabeth	United Kingdom	The ship ran aground and was severely damaged at Lowestoft, Suffolk. She was refloated.
Ellen	United Kingdom	The ship ran aground at "Real", Ireland and was damaged. She was on a voyage from Tralee, County Kerry to Newhaven, Sussex. She was refloated and taken in to Kilrush, County Clare.
Henri Marie	France	The schooner was driven ashore on the Isle of Arran, United Kingdom. She was refloated and taken in to Ardrossan, Ayrshire, United Kingdom for repairs.
Laurel	United Kingdom	The brig was in collision with the paddle steamer Thistle United Kingdom and sank off the Pladda Lighthouse, Ayrshire with the loss of all fourteen crew. She was on a voyage from Demerara, British Guiana to Glasgow, Renfrewshire.
Le Juif Errant	France	The ship departed from Calcutta, India for Réunion. No further trace, presumed foundered with the loss of all hands.
Margary	United Kingdom	The schooner ran aground on the Goodwin Sands, Kent. She was on a voyage from Seaham, County Durham to Bilbao, Spain. She was refloated and resumed her voyage, having refused assistance from the Ramsgate Lifeboat.
Patagonia	United Kingdom	The ship was wrecked on Bond's Reef, off the coast of New Caledonia. Her crew were rescued. She was on a voyage from Sydney, New South Wales to Manila, Spanish East Indies.

== 5 February ==
List of shipwrecks: February 1851
Ship	State	Description
Alacrity	United Kingdom	The ship was driven ashore and wrecked at Breaksea Point, Glamorgan. She was on a voyage from London to Gloucester.
Charlotte and Mary	United Kingdom	The sloop was driven ashore at the Landguard Fort, Felixtowe, Suffolk.
Cinisca	Kingdom of Sardinia	The polacca was wrecked on the Punta Brava Rocks, on the coast of Uruguay. She was on a voyage from Genoa to Buenos Aires, Argentina.
Eleanora, and Vanguard	United Kingdom	The schooner Eleanora and the paddle steamer Vanguard collided off the Corsewall Lighthouse, Wigtownshire. Eleanora sank with the loss of three of her six crew. Survivors were rescued by Vanguard, which was on a voyage from Glasgow, Renfrewshire to Dublin. She put back to Greenock, Renfrewshire.
Frederick and Alfred	United Kingdom	The ship was driven ashore at Bridlington, Yorkshire. She was on a voyage from Newcastle upon Tyne, Northumberland to London.
Grace	United Kingdom	The ship was in collision with a schooner and sank in the North Sea off Trimingham, Norfolk. Her crew survived. She was on a voyage from London to Newcastle upon Tyne.
Maria Terpsithea	Greece	The brig was wrecked on the Arklow Bank, in the Irish Sea off the coast of County Wicklow, United Kingdom with the loss of nine of her seventeen crew. One survivor was rescued by the schooner Cambria (United Kingdom), the other seven by the brig Delight (United Kingdom). Maria Terpsithea was on a voyage from Liverpool, Lancashire, United Kingdom to Alexandria, Egypt.
Midge	United Kingdom	The schooner was wrecked in Mogador Bay, Morocco.
Plover	United Kingdom	The paddle steamer suffered a boiler explosion at Glasgow, Renfrewshire with the loss of a crew member. She was on a voyage from Glasgow to Bowling, Dunbartonshire.
Witch	United Kingdom	The sloop was discovered derelict in the Irish Sea off Ulverston, Lancashire. She was beached at Aldingham, Lancashire.
Worcester	United Kingdom	The ship departed from Calcutta, India for the Cape of Good Hope and London. No further trace, presumed foundered with the loss of all hands.

== 6 February ==
List of shipwrecks: 6 February 1851
Ship	State	Description
Eleanora	United Kingdom	The schooner was in collision with Vanguard (United Kingdom) and sank off the Corsewall Lighthouse, Wigtownshire with the loss of three of her six crew. Survivors were rescued by Vanguard.
Unity	United Kingdom	The sloop was wrecked at Villers-sur-Mer, Calvados, France. Her cre were rescued. She was on a voyage from Blyth, Northumberland to Rouen, Seine-Inférieure, France.

== 7 February ==
List of shipwrecks: 7 February 1851
Ship	State	Description
Bee	United Kingdom	The ship ran aground on the Zouteland sandbank, at the mouth of the Scheldt. She was on a voyage from Newcastle upon Tyne, Northumberland to Dunkirk, Nord, France. She was refloated and taken in to Vlissingen, Zeeland, Netherlands.
Betsy	United Kingdom	The ship ran aground on the Brake Sand, in the North Sea. She was on a voyage from Limerick to London. She was refloated and put in to Ramsgate, Kent in a leaky condition.
Shamrock	United Kingdom	The schooner struck the Blackwater Bank, in the Irish Sea. She was subsequently driven ashore and wrecked 16 nautical miles (30 km) north of Wexford. Her crew were rescued. She was on a voyage from Liverpool, Lancashire to Lisbon, Portugal.
Yorkshire	United States	The ship lost her rudder and sprang a leak in the Irish Sea. She was on a voyage from Liverpool, Lancashire to New York. She attempted to put back to Liverpool, but was consequently towed in to Holyhead, Anglesey, where she ran aground on 20 February.

== 8 February ==
List of shipwrecks: 8 February 1851
Ship	State	Description
Agatha	Sweden	The brig was in collision with a schooner and was damaged. She subsequently ran aground off "Peil Harbour", Walney Island, Lancashire, United Kingdom. Agatha was on a voyage from Liverpool, Lancashire to Buenos Aires, Argentina. She was refloated and put in to Fleetwood, Lancashire.
Amazon	United States	The schooner was severely damaged by fire at St. Thomas, Virgin Islands. She was consequently condemned.
James Shepherd	United Kingdom	The ship was wrecked on a reef off Cape Agulhas, Cape Colony. All on board were rescued.
Rosalind	United Kingdom	The ship caught fire and was abandoned in the Indian Ocean. Her crew were rescued. She was on a voyage from London to Suez, Egypt.
William	United Kingdom	The sailing barge capsized in the River Severn between Sharpness, Gloucestershire and the mouth of the River Wye with the loss of all hands. She was on a voyage from Gloucester to Chepstow, Monmouthshire.

== 9 February ==
List of shipwrecks: 9 February 1851
Ship	State	Description
Antonio	Spain	The brig ran aground on Collin's Patch, in the Florida Reef. She was on a voyage from Havana, Cuba to Hamburg. She was refloated and taken in to Key West, Florida, United States.
Eliza	France	The barque exploded and sank at Rio de Janeiro, Brazil with the loss of ten lives. There were over 200 survivors. She was on a voyage from France to California, United States.
Frederick	United Kingdom	The ship sprang a leak and sank off Happisburgh, Norfolk. Her crew were rescued by the brig Stokesley (United Kingdom). Frederick was on a voyage from Hartlepool, County Durham to London.
Frederick	Sweden	The ship was wrecked on Ameland, Friesland, Netherlands. Her crew were rescued. She was on a voyage from Gothenburg to Mallorca, Spain.
Phœnix	Belgium	The ship ran aground on the Anchovis Berg Bank. She was on a voyage from Liverpool, Lancashire, United Kingdom to Antwerp. She was refloated on 11 February and taken in to Antwerp.

== 10 February ==
List of shipwrecks: 10 February 1851
Ship	State	Description
Sisters	(United Kingdom of Great Britain and Ireland) Isle of Man	The sloop struck the quayside and capsized at Liverpool, Lancashire. She was on a voyage from Liverpool to Douglas. She was refloated on 14 February and beached at Birkenhead, Cheshire.
St. Claire	United Kingdom	The ship was destroyed by fire in the Indian Ocean. Her crew were rescued. She was on a voyage from Liverpool to Bombay, India.
St. Julien	France	The ship ran aground at Fromentine, Vendée and was consequently beached. She was on a voyage from Nantes, Loire-Inférieure to Newport, Monmouthshire, United Kingdom.
Tagus	Portugal	The ship was driven ashore in Bootle Bay. She was on a voyage from Liverpool to Lisbon. She was refloated.

== 11 February ==
List of shipwrecks: 11 February 1851
Ship	State	Description
Eagle	United Kingdom	The ship ran aground on the Indian Bank, in Liverpool Bay. She was on a voyage from Liverpool to "Bueno Ventura". She was refloated and put back to Liverpool.
Emilie	France	The schooner was wrecked off Môle-Saint-Nicolas, Haiti. Her crew were rescued. She was on a voyage from Port-au-Prince, Haiti to Marseille, Bouches-du-Rhône.
Ocean Queen	United Kingdom	The ship ran aground at Liverpool. She was on a voyage from Liverpool to Genoa, Kingdom of Sardinia.

== 12 February ==
List of shipwrecks: 12 February 1851
Ship	State	Description
John Bromham	United Kingdom	The ship was wrecked south of the mouth of the Benin River. Her crew were rescued. She was on a voyage from Liverpool, Lancashire to the Cameroons and Benin City, Africa. The wreck was burnt on 14 February.

== 13 February ==
List of shipwrecks: 13 February 1851
Ship	State	Description
Remembrance	United Kingdom	The ship was driven ashore at Sheringham, Norfolk. She was on a voyage from South Shields, County Durham to Constantinople, Ottoman Empire. She was refloated the next day and taken in to Great Yarmouth, Norfolk.
Rosalie	Belgium	The ship was driven ashore at "Anstruweer". She was on a voyage from Antwerp to St. Ubes, Portugal.

== 14 February ==
List of shipwrecks: 14 February 1851
Ship	State	Description
Earl of Selkirk	United Kingdom	The schooner ran aground at Liverpool, Lancashire. She was on a voyage from Liverpool to Whitehaven, Cumberland.
Maria Joaquina	Portugal	The ship was driven ashore and wrecked at Figueira da Foz. She was on a voyage from Figueira da Foz to Bahia, Brazil.

== 15 February ==
List of shipwrecks: 15 February 1851
Ship	State	Description
China	France	The ship was abandoned. Her crew were rescued by Jeune Vincente (France) before she sank. China was on a voyage from Bordeaux, Gironde to Nantes, Loire-Inférieure.
Ganges	United Kingdom	The ship was destroyed by fire at Penang, British Malaya. She was on a voyage from Penang to Madras, India.
Margretha	Netherlands	The galiot was driven ashore between Newry and Warrenpoint, County Antrim, United Kingdom. She was refloated on 17 February and towed in to Warrenpoint.
Rose	United Kingdom	The ship foundered in the Irish Sea off the coast of County Wicklow. Her crew were rescued. She was on a voyage from Glasgow, Renfrewshire to Algiers, Algeria.

== 16 February ==
List of shipwrecks: 16 February 1851
Ship	State	Description
Despatch	United Kingdom	The ship was driven ashore in Lough Ryan. She was on a voyage from Rouen, Seine-Inférieure, France to Londonderry. She was refloated the next day and taken in to Londonderry.
Ringdove	United Kingdom	The ship was driven ashore and wrecked north of Filey, Yorkshire. Her crew were rescued.
Watson	United Kingdom	The sloop was driven ashore 4 nautical miles (7.4 km) north of Filey. She was on a voyage from Newcastle upon Tyne, Northumberland to London. She was refloated and resumed her voyage.

== 17 February ==
List of shipwrecks: 17 February 1851
Ship	State	Description
City of Worcester	United Kingdom	The steamship ran aground in the River Severn downstream of Framilode, Gloucestershire.
Commerce	United Kingdom	The ship was driven ashore at Saltfleet, Lincolnshire.
Dolon	United Kingdom	The ship ran aground on the Barker Sand, in the North Sea off the coast of Norfolk. She was on a voyage from Warkworth, Northumberland to London. She was refloated and resumed her voyage.

== 18 February ==
List of shipwrecks: 18 February 1851
Ship	State	Description
Constantine	United Kingdom	The smack was wrecked on The Needles, Isle of Wight. She was on a voyage from Saundersfoot, Pembrokeshire to Portsmouth, Hampshire.
Mary	United Kingdom	The sloop ran aground and capsized in the "River Bebble", Lancashire. Her crew were rescued.
Medora	(United Kingdom of Great Britain and Ireland) Jersey	The smack capsized and was severely damaged at Aberystwyth, Cardiganshire.
Swallow	United Kingdom	The smack struck a rock off Lindisfarne, Northumberland and was damaged. She was on a voyage from Montrose, Forfarshire to London. She put in to Berwick upon Tweed, Northumberland in a leaky condition.

== 19 February ==
List of shipwrecks: 19 February 1851
Ship	State	Description
Admiral Collingwood	United Kingdom	The ship struck the pier and sank at Scarborough, Yorkshire. She was on a voyage from Hartlepool, County Durham to London.
Laura Ann	United Kingdom	The sloop was driven ashore near Southport, Lancashire. She was on a voyage from Caernarfon to Lancaster, Lancashire.
Mary	United Kingdom	The flat sank in the North Channel.
Pilgrim	United Kingdom	The ship ran aground on the Holm Sand, in the North Sea. She was on a voyage from Hull, Yorkshire to Pernambuco, Brazil. She was refloated and put back to Hull in a leaky condition.

== 20 February ==
List of shipwrecks: 20 February 1851
Ship	State	Description
Laura Dorothea	France	The ship was wrecked at the entrance to the Gulf of St. Tropez with the loss of a crew member. She was on a voyage from Naples, Kingdom of the Two Sicilies to Marseille, Bouches-du-Rhône.

== 22 February ==
List of shipwrecks: February 1851
Ship	State	Description
Albert	United States	The schooner was wrecked at Young's Cove, Nova Scotia, British North America with the loss of all hands. She was on a voyage from Cornwallis, Maine to Saint John, New Brunswick, British North America.
Celina	United Kingdom	The ship struck the Begueneau Rocks and was damaged. She was on a voyage from Plymouth, Devon to Nantes, Loire-Inférieure, France. She put in to Le Pouliguen, Loire-Inférieure, where she ran aground.
Humility	United Kingdom	The ship ran aground on the Cork Sand, in the North Sea off the coast of Suffolk. She was on a voyage from London to Hull, Yorkshire. She was refloated and resumed her voyage.
John	United Kingdom	The schooner collided with HMS Resistance (Royal Navy) and sank off The Lizard, Cornwall. Two crew were rescued by HMS Resistance. John was on a voyage from Caernarfon to London.
Sarah	United Kingdom	The ship was wrecked on the Helwelk Sands with the loss of all hands.
Selina	United Kingdom	The ship was driven ashore at "Beguenean", France. She was on a voyage from Plymouth, Devon to Nantes, Loire-Inférieure. She was refloated and taken in to "Doulinguen", France in a leaky condition.

== 23 February ==
List of shipwrecks: 23 February 1851
Ship	State	Description
Albion	United Kingdom	The schooner was driven ashore and wrecked at Fined Point, County Sligo. She was on a voyage from Cardiff, Glamorgan to Sligo.
Corkscrew	United Kingdom	The steamship ran aground on the Burbo Bank, in Liverpool Bay. She was on a voyage from Liverpool, Lancashire to Dunkirk, Nord, France. She was refloated and resumed her voyage.
Groja	United Kingdom	The ship sprang a leak and was dismasted in the Atlantic Ocean with the loss of two of her 26 crew. Survivors were rescued by Cygnet (United Kingdom). Groja was on a voyage from Bristol, Gloucestershire to Valparaíso, Chile.
Matchless	United Kingdom	The ship ran aground at Whitby, Yorkshire. She was refloated the next day.
Mazagran	France	The ship was wrecked on the Longsand, in the North Sea off the coast of Essex, United Kingdom. Her crew were rescued. She was on a voyage from Newcastle upon Tyne, Northumberland, United Kingdom to Port-Vendres, Pyrénées-Orientales.
Taag	Netherlands	The hooker was in collision with a brig and sank in the English Channel. Her crew were rescued. She was on a voyage from Vlaardingen, South Holland to Lisbon, Portugal.

== 24 February ==
List of shipwrecks: 24 February 1851
Ship	State	Description
Dunkerquois	France	The ship was driven ashore at New Romney, Kent, United Kingdom, She was on a voyage from Dunkirk, Nord to Constantinople, Ottoman Empire.
Etoile des Mers	France	The brig was driven ashore at "St. Harem", Ottoman Syria.
Ivanhoe	United States	The ship was driven onto the Round Shoal, off Nantucket, Massachusetts and was wrecked.
Nixon	United Kingdom	The ship ran aground and was damaged on the Sheringham Shoals, in the North Sea off the coast of Norfolk. She was on a voyage from Seaham, County Durham to London. She was refloated and taken in to Blakeney, Norfolk.

== 25 February ==
List of shipwrecks: 25 February 1851
Ship	State	Description
Anne	United Kingdom	The barque was wrecked on a reef in the Strait of Malacca. She was on a voyage from Singapore to China.
Mars	United Kingdom	The ship was wrecked on the Foy Rocks, off Kay Biscoyne. She was on a voyage from Cardenas, Cuba to Halifax, Nova Scotia, British North America.
Oriente	Kingdom of the Two Sicilies	The ship was driven ashore on the coast of Kent, United Kingdom. She was on a voyage from Dover, Kent to Newcastle upon Tyne, Northumberland, United Kingdom. She was refloated and put back to Dover in a leaky condition.
Voyager	United Kingdom	The ship was damaged by fire at Newport, Monmouthshire.

== 26 February ==
List of shipwrecks: 26 February 1851
Ship	State	Description
Ann	United Kingdom	The ship was wrecked on Bintang Point, Malaya. She was on a voyage from Singapore to China. She was refloated in late May and towed in to Singapore.
Liberty	United Kingdom	The schooner was wrecked 8 nautical miles (15 km) east of Calais, France with the loss of all hands.
Victoria	United Kingdom	The ship ran aground in the River Shannon. She was on a voyage from Odesa to Limerick.
Voyager	United Kingdom	The ship was damaged by fire at Milford Haven, Pembrokeshire.
????	Austrian Empire	The brig was in collision with the brig Uredan ( Austrian Empire) and foundered off Kinsale, County Cork, United Kingdom. Her crew were rescued by Uredan.

== 27 February ==
List of shipwrecks: 27 February 1851
Ship	State	Description
Fanny	United Kingdom	The ship was stranded by falling water levels in the Danube and capsized near Galaţi, Ottoman Empire.
Jane Archibald	United Kingdom	The ship was stranded by falling water levels in the Danube and capsized near Galaţi. She was refloated on 3 March.
Phœnix	United Kingdom	The sloop ran aground on the Mussel Rocks, in the Bristol Channel and was damaged. She was refloated and towed in to Bristol, Gloucestershire by the steamship Neath Abbey (United Kingdom).
Ulrica	Sweden	The barque was severely damaged by fire at Charleston, South Carolina, United States. She subsequently capsized and was declared a total loss.

== 28 February ==
List of shipwrecks: 28 February 1851
Ship	State	Description
Dorothy Ann	United Kingdom	The ship was driven ashore and wrecked on Skagen, Denmark. She was on a voyage from Sunderland, County Durham to Danzig.
Rebecca and Eliza	United Kingdom	The ship ran aground in the Grimsby Channel, Isles of Scilly. She was on a voyage from Liverpool, Lancashire to Jersey, Channel Islands. She was refloated.

== Unknown date ==
List of shipwrecks: Unknown date in February 1851
Ship	State	Description
Alexandra	United Kingdom	The ship was driven ashore at Reval, Russia before 5 February. She was refloated on 10 September.
Ann Wood	United Kingdom	The ship was driven ashore near Harrington, Cumberland. She was refloated on 1 March and towed in to Maryport, Cumberland.
Antigua	United Kingdom	The brig was abandoned in the Atlantic Ocean before 8 February.
Brutus	United Kingdom	The brig was lost in the Bahía de San Quintín before 20 February with the loss of all but two of her crew.
Dunkerquois	France	The ship was driven ashore at New Romney, Kent, United Kingdom. She was refloated on 28 February and taken in to Dover, Kent.
Jane	United Kingdom	The schooner foundered before 5 February. She was on a voyage from Truxillo, Mexico to Belize City, British Honduras.
Jupiter	France	The ship was wrecked at the mouth of the Rio Grande de São Pedro before 26 February.
Laurel	United Kingdom	The ship foundered in the Bristol Channel off Penarth, Glamorgan with the loss of all hands in early February.
Lord George Bentinck	United Kingdom	The ship was wrecked on the coast of Glamorgan in early February.
Minerva	United Kingdom	The brig was driven ashore and wrecked near Charleston, South Carolina, United States before 21 February. She was on a voyage from Falmouth, Jamaica to the Clyde.
Nova Olinda	Portugal	The brigantine was lost off Lisbon before 11 February. Her crew were rescued by "HNLMS Ardgoeno" (Royal Netherlands Navy).
Prince of Wales	(United Kingdom of Great Britain and Ireland) British North America	The ship was wrecked in Fortune Bay before 13 February.
San Michele	Kingdom of the Two Sicilies	The brig was driven ashore at "Cape Gamarth".
Veeran	United Kingdom	The brig was abandoned in the Atlantic Ocean before 27 February. She was towed in to Glandore, County Cork on that date.
