= Mull of Kintyre Lighthouse =

Mull of Kintyre Lighthouse Cantyre
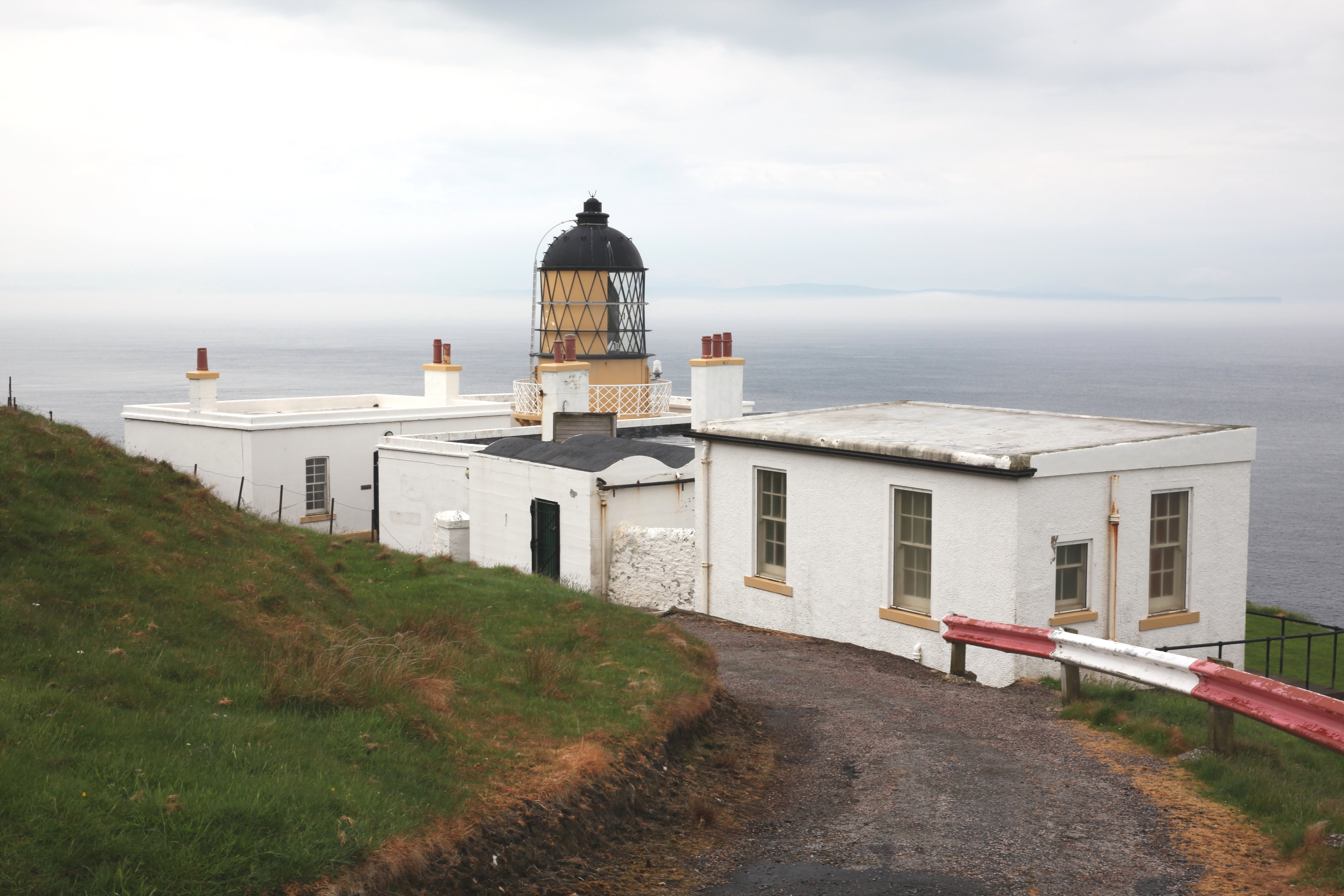
- Mull of Kintyre Lighthouse
- Location: Kintyre peninsula Argyll and Bute; Scotland; United Kingdom
- OS grid: NR58020722
- Coordinates: 55.310421°N 5.803254°W

Tower
- Constructed: 1788
- Designed by: Thomas Smith
- Construction: brick tower
- Automated: 1996
- Height: 12 m (39 ft)
- Shape: cylindrical tower with balcony and lantern
- Markings: white tower, ochre balcony, black lantern
- Operator: National Trust for Scotland
- Heritage: category A listed building

Light
- First lit: 1820 (rebuilt)
- Focal height: 91 m (299 ft)
- Range: 24 nmi (44 km)
- Characteristic: Fl (2) W 20s.

The Mull of Kintyre Lighthouse on Mull of Kintyre was the second lighthouse commissioned in Scotland by the Commissioners of the Northern Lights. It was designed and built by Thomas Smith and completed in 1788. Smith had previously designed the light at Kinnaird Head, but Mull of Kintyre was a far more substantial project, in a far more remote location.

In 1782, a series of storms hit Scotland that resulted in ship wrecks and detrimental financial impacts on the merchant class. The issue prompted George Dempster of Dunnichen, then M.P. for Fife and Forfar Burghs to introduce a bill in 1786, The Act for Erecting Certain Lighthouses in the Northern Parts of Great Britain, that led to the creation of the Northern Lighthouse Board. After the bill passed into law, four initial lighthouses were planned: Mull of Kintyre, Eilean Glas, North Ronaldsay, and Kinnaird Head.

The hazardous location of the lighthouse meant the materials for constructing the light itself could not be delivered by sea; each piece of the light had to be carried in small parcels by packhorse from Campbeltown, some 12 miles away. By early 1788, the lighthouse tower was ready for the light to be installed but completion was delayed so the grounds of the lighthouse could be made more hospitable and for light keepers. In October 1788, local crofter Matthew Hardie was installed as the first light keeper.

The lighthouse was rebuilt in the 1820s. The light was fixed until 1906, when it was converted to flashing, and its power increased from 8,000 to 281,000 candelas. It was converted to electrical power in 1976, automated in 1996 and is now monitored from Edinburgh.

The former keeper's cottages are now run as holiday cottages by the National Trust for Scotland.

== See also ==
- List of lighthouses in Scotland
- List of Northern Lighthouse Board lighthouses
