= Sanda Island Lighthouse =

Lighthouse in Scotland

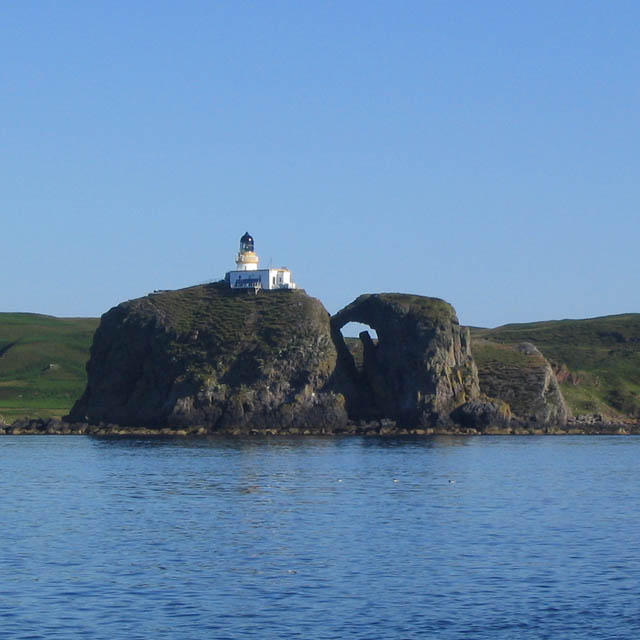
- Sanda lighthouse, nicknamed "the Ship"
- Location: Sanda Island, Argyll and Bute, United Kingdom
- OS grid: NR7254903715
- Coordinates: 55.275°N 5.5828°W

Tower
- Constructed: 1850
- Built by: Alan Stevenson
- Construction: masonry tower
- Automated: 1991
- Height: 15 m (49 ft)
- Shape: cylindrical tower with balcony and lantern attached to 1-storey keeper’s house
- Markings: white tower
- Power source: mains electricity
- Operator: Northern Lighthouse Board
- Heritage: category A listed building

Light
- Focal height: 50 m (160 ft)
- Range: 15 nmi (28 km; 17 mi)
- Characteristic: Fl W 10s

The Sanda Island Lighthouse is a lighthouse on Sanda Island, Argyll and Bute, United Kingdom.

One of the thirteen major lighthouses designed and built by Alan Stevenson, the lighthouse was established in 1850, after a series of shipwrecks in the area. The three "steps" of the lighthouse were due to the cliff on which it was built, and remain a unique design in Scotland.

Automated in 1991, the lighthouse is operated by the Northern Lighthouse Board, and designated a Category A listed building.

== History ==
=== Construction ===
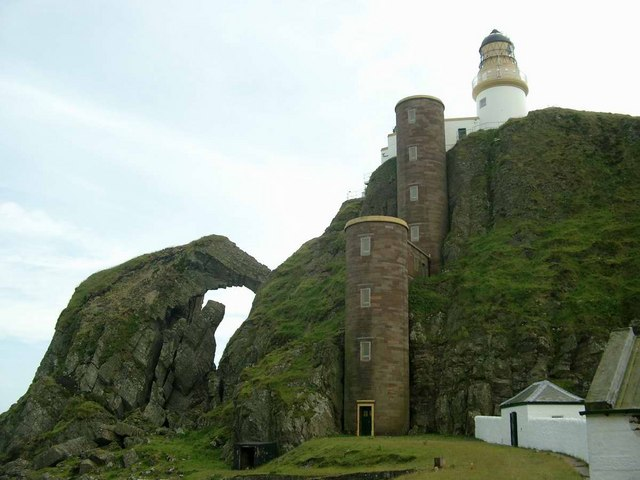
Three "steps" of the lighthouse

On 2 December 1825, the ship Christiana, while on a voyage from Greenock, Renfrewshire, to Trinidad, was wrecked on Patterson's Rock, off Sanda Island. Earlier wrecks included Hannah in December 1770, and Henrietta in October 1816.

The wrecks created a demand for a lighthouse to be constructed on the island, as the island was the turning-point into the Firth of Clyde, next to the North Channel.

Initially, Trinity House proposed moving the Mull of Kintyre Lighthouse to the island, as the Mull lighthouse was frequently hidden due to fog. However, the commissioners of the Northern Lighthouse Board rejected this plan. As more wrecks occurred, the commissioners then decided to build on the summit of the Ship Rock, a detached lump of the island. The lighthouse was a stone masonry tower in three "steps" against the face of Ship Rock, and was designed and built by Alan Stevenson. This design remains unique in Scotland.

=== Operation ===
On 1 January 1850, the lighthouse was lit with a fixed red light from sunset till sunrise. The lighthouse was relieved by boat. In September 1876, a fog signal was installed at about 150 feet (46 m) above sea level. In November 1882, the character of the lighthouse was changed to intermittent white light, with a period of light for 8s, and darkness for 16s. The light had 61,000 candlepower. In March 1900, Daniel Dempsey, the lighthouse's boatman, and his two sons, were awarded a silver medal by the National Lifeboat Association, for saving the crew of Sovereign.

In 1991, the lighthouse was converted to an automated light. This light remains operational to date.

== Incidents ==
- 21 July 1869: Clansman, a 271-ton paddle steamer, ran aground, 0.5 miles (800 m) northwest of the lighthouse. The steamer was bound for Glasgow from Stornoway.
- 25 December 1899: Sovereign, a 97-ton schooner, was wrecked 0.25 miles (400 m) from the lighthouse. The vessel was bound for Glasgow from Thurso.
- 16 March 1946: Byron Darnton, a 7,176-ton steamship, ran aground and was broken into two, 150 yards (140 m) from the lighthouse. The ship was inward bound from Copenhagen, and no casualties were reported. In 1989, a pub was opened on the island, named after the wreck. The pub closed in 2010.
- 8 March 1957: SS Gracehill, a 450-ton steamship, ran aground 0.25 miles (400 m) from the lighthouse, after her engine room was flooded. The ship was bound for Ayr from Londonderry.
- 29 October 1970: Hereford Express, a 500-ton motor ship, was stranded on the Mull of Kintyre, and was towed by Hope Isle, a coaster. The tow line broke repeatedly and the ship eventually drifted onto Boiler Reef, 0.25 miles (400 m). The ship was bound for Glasgow from Londonderry, and carried 262 head of cattle. The Royal Air Force flew RSPCA inspectors onto the ship to inspect the cattle. Three cattle managed to swim onto the island, 140 cattle drowned prior to the arrival of the RSPCA inspectors, and the remaining cattle were shot. In total, 259 cattle died.

== See also ==
- List of Northern Lighthouse Board lighthouses
- List of lighthouses in Scotland
