= Alpo =

Alpo may refer to:

- Alpo, a village in the comune of Villafranca di Verona in Italy
- Alpo (pet food)
- Alpo K. Marttinen (1908–1975), Finnish and American army officer.
- Alpo Martinez (1966–2021), American drug dealer
- Alpo Rusi (born 1949), diplomat
- Alpo Suhonen (born 1948), hockey coach
- Association of Lunar and Planetary Observers

== See also ==
- Alpos
