= North Ronaldsay Lighthouse =

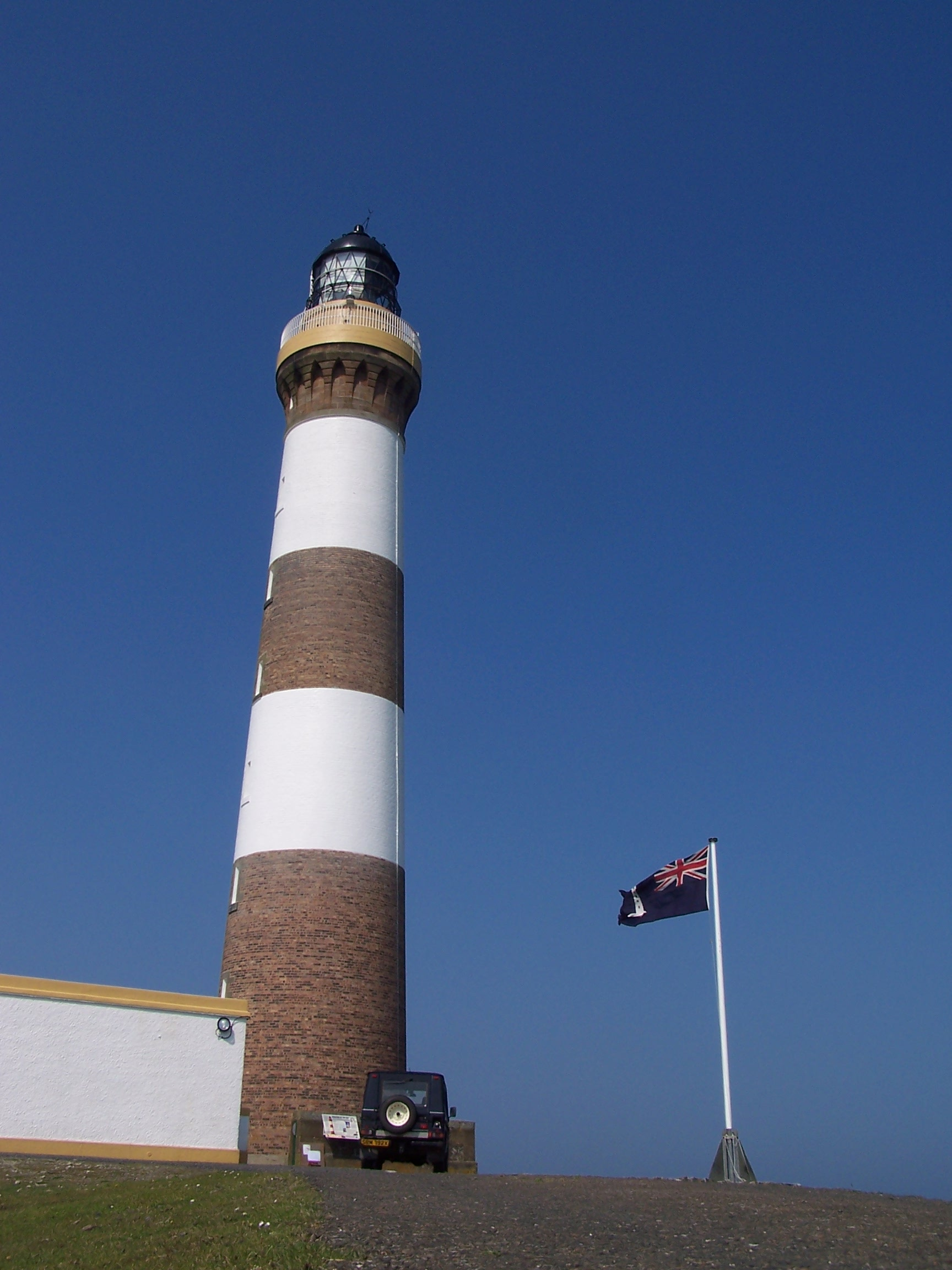
- North Ronaldsay lighthouse lies at the north of the island at Point of Sinsoss
- Location: North Ronaldsay, Orkney, Cross and Burness, United Kingdom
- OS grid: HY7843955996
- Coordinates: 59°23′23″N 2°22′53″W

Tower
- Constructed: 1852
- Designed by: Alan Stevenson
- Construction: brick (tower)
- Automated: 1998
- Height: 42 m (138 ft)
- Shape: tapered cylindrical tower with balcony and lantern
- Markings: unpainted tower with two white bands, black lantern, ochre trim
- Operator: North Ronaldsay Trust
- Heritage: category B listed building
- Fog signal: blast every 60s.

Light
- First lit: 1854
- Focal height: 43 m (141 ft)
- Range: 24 nmi (44 km; 28 mi)
- Characteristic: Fl W 10s

North Ronaldsay Lighthouse was built in 1854 on the island of North Ronaldsay in the Orkney Islands, Scotland, just over 40 years after Dennis Head Old Beacon was deactivated in the early 1800s. It was built by David Stevenson and Thomas Stevenson and lies at the north of the island at Point of Sinsoss located 500 yards west of Dennis Head Old Beacon, and boasts Britain's tallest land-based lighthouse tower at 139 feet. The old fog siren with notable red trumpet was replaced by an electric diaphragm-type horn. That horn was discontinued in favour of a Tyfon horn consisting of 8 mini-trumpets installed on the building that once housed the fog siren. The Tyfon horn gives three blasts every 60 seconds. The electric beeper horn now lies flat on the ground next to the fog signal building, and is still in service today.

Northern Ronaldsay Lighthouse was one of the last three lighthouses to be automated by the Northern Lighthouse Board on 30 March 1998, along with the Butt of Lewis lighthouse.

== See also ==
- List of lighthouses in Scotland
- List of Northern Lighthouse Board lighthouses
