= Pladda =

Island in the Firth of Clyde, Scotland, UK

Pladaigh (Gaelic)
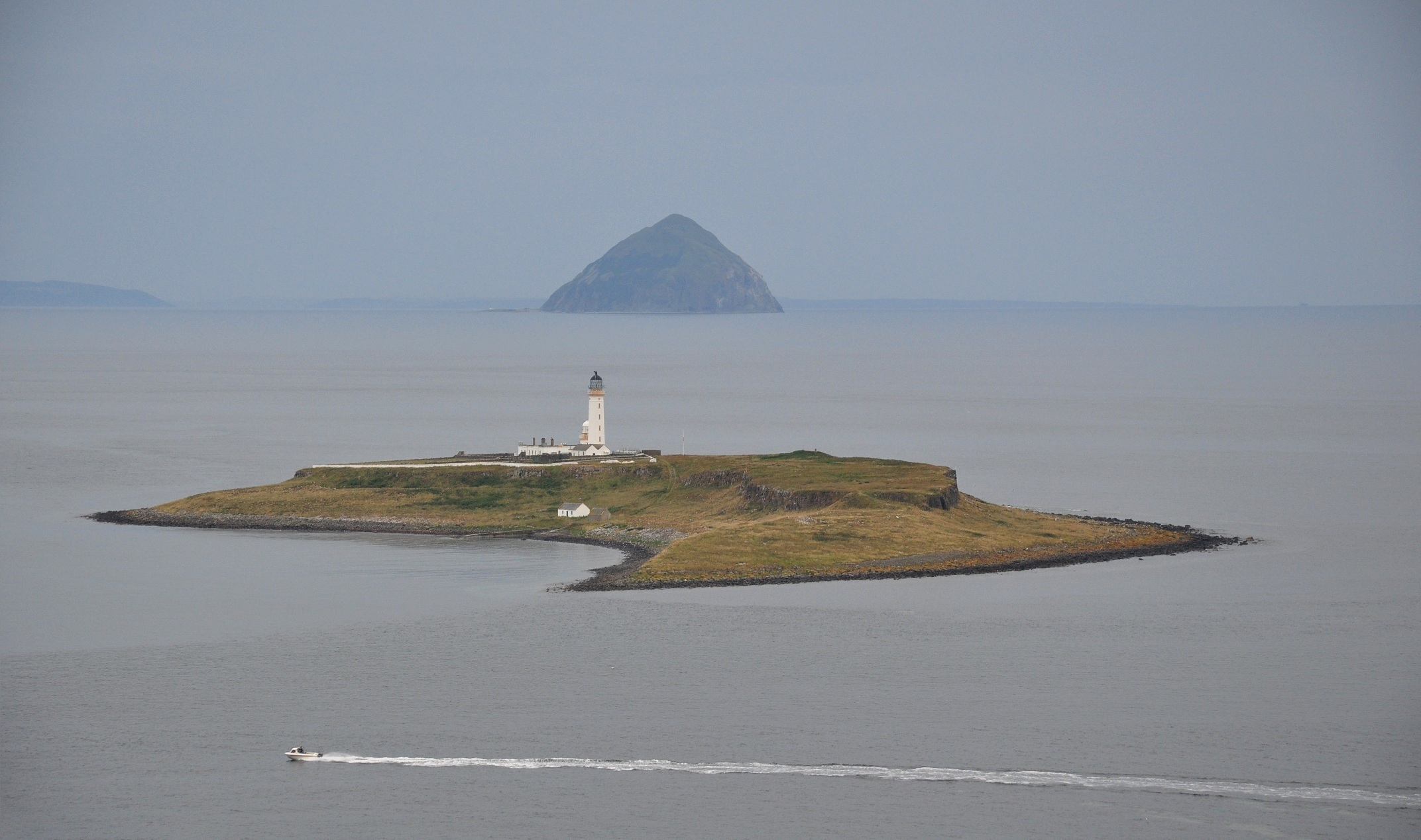
- Pladda seen from the Isle of Arran, with Ailsa Craig in the background

Location
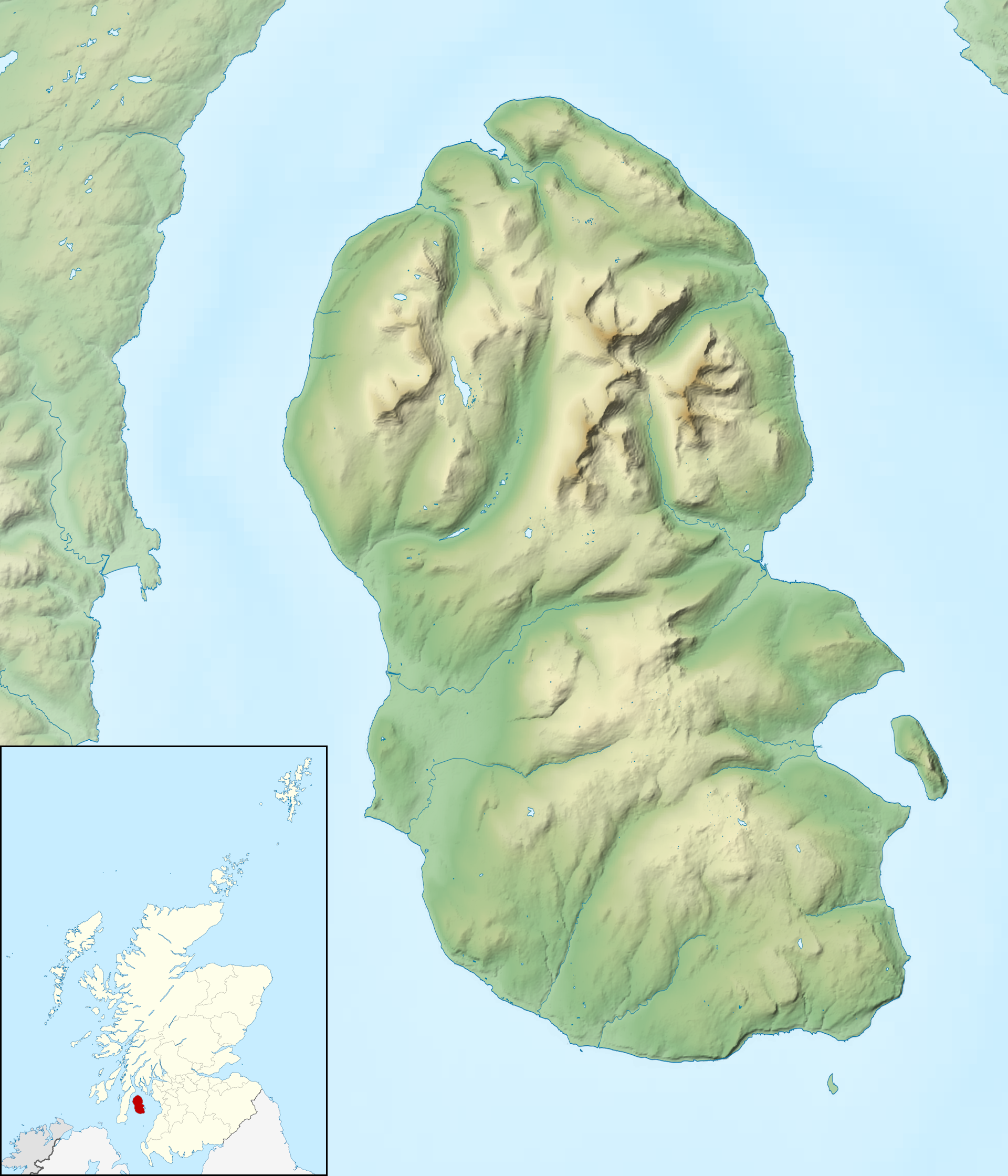
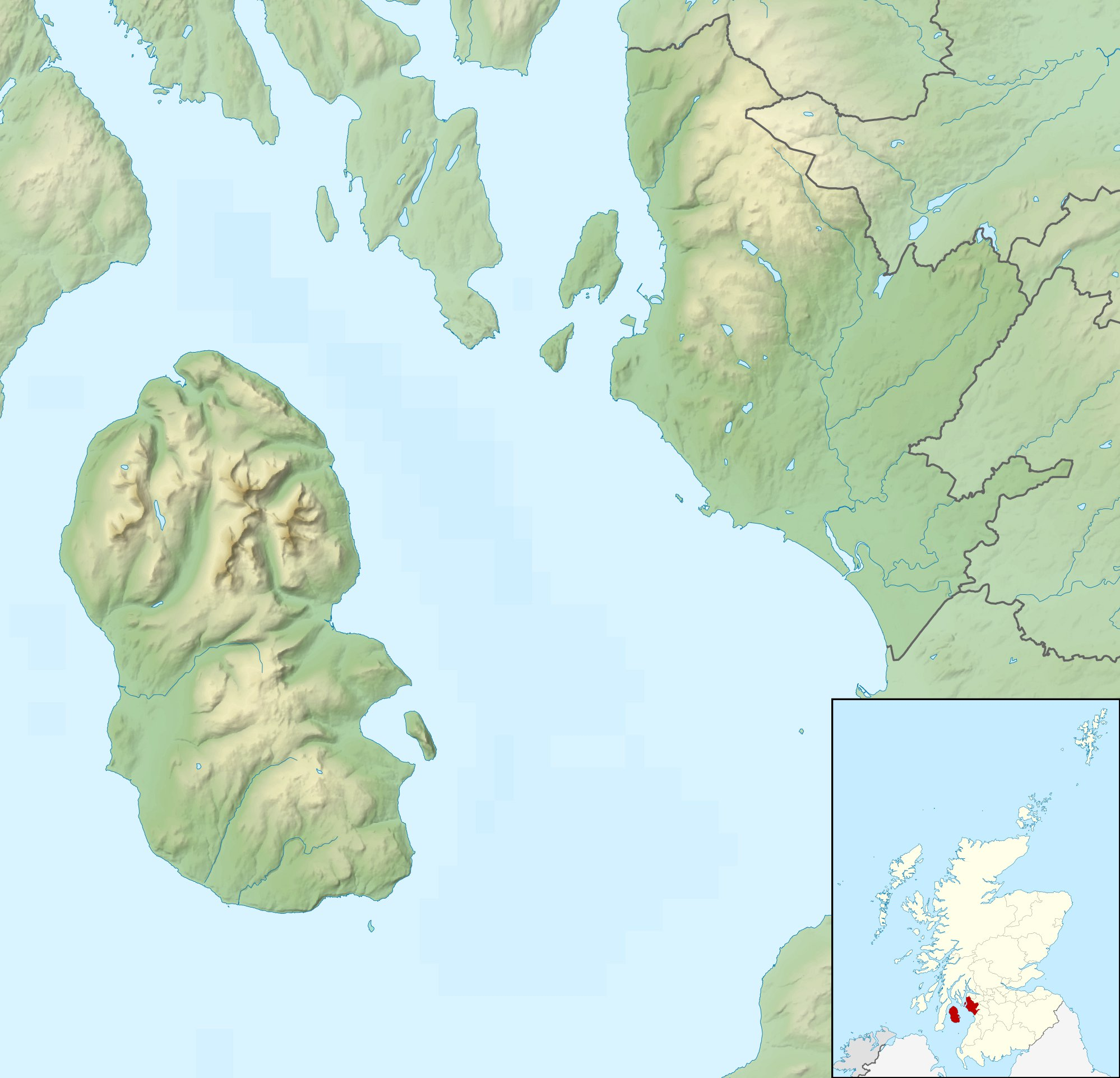
- Pladda shown next to Arran Pladda shown within North Ayrshire
- Coordinates: 55°25′33″N 5°7′10″W

Physical geography
- Area: 13.4 ha (33 1/8 acres)

Administration
- Council area: North Ayrshire
- Country: Scotland
- Sovereign state: United Kingdom

Demographics
- Population: 0

Pladda (Scottish Gaelic: Pladaigh) is an uninhabited island 1 km (0.62 mi) off the south coast of the Isle of Arran in the Firth of Clyde at grid reference NS027191, western Scotland. It is home to the automated Pladda Lighthouse. The island is privately owned, having been put up for sale by Arran Estate in 1990. The island was put on sale in 2022 for £350,000, and bought shortly after.

== Geography ==
Pladda is a small, flat, teardrop-shaped island, 700 m (2,300 ft) long and rising to just 27 m (89 ft) above sea level. Unusually for such a small island, it has its own source of fresh water. Pladda shares its name with Pladda Island, a tiny islet situated in the Lynn of Lorne between Lismore and Ardmucknish Bay.

== Lighthouse ==
Pladda Lighthouse and its ancillary buildings stand at the southern end of Pladda.

== Church ==
There appears to have been a church or chapel on Pladda. John of Fordun and other chroniclers from 1400 to 1500 speak of the isle of St Blase of Pladda. Nothing now remains to mark its site, and its whereabouts are unknown.

== In popular culture ==
Pladda and its lighthouse feature extensively in Peter Hill's 2003 book Stargazing: Memoirs of a Young Lighthouse Keeper. They were also filming locations for "Queen Victoria Syndrome", the first episode of season 5 of The Crown.
