= Kinnaird Head Lighthouses =

Lighthouses in Scotland

Kinnaird Head lighthouses
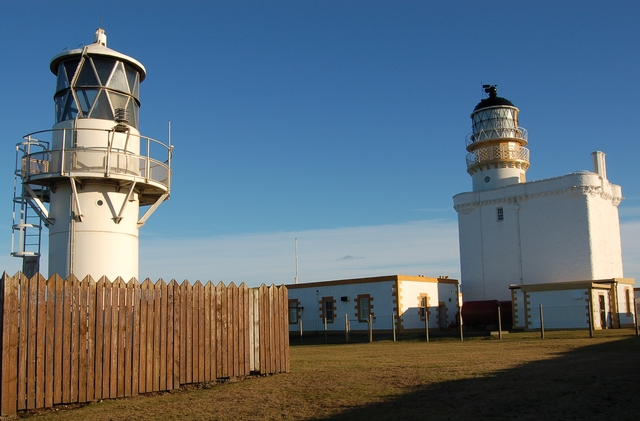
- Kinnaird Head current lighthouse (left) and the historical (right)
- Location: Kinnaird Head, Aberdeenshire, United Kingdom
- Coordinates: 57°42′N 2°00′W

Light
- Focal height: 25 m (82 ft)
- Kinnaird Head Lighthouse
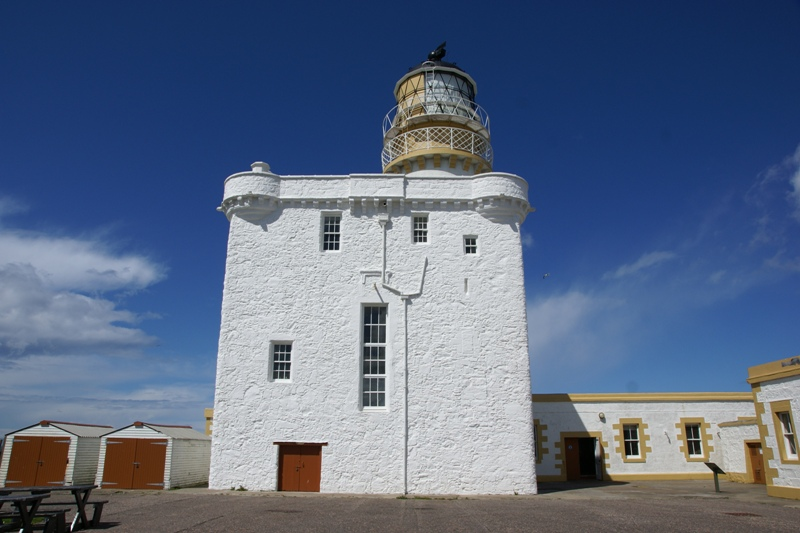
- Constructed: 1787
- Designed by: Thomas Smith
- Construction: stone
- Height: 22 m (72 ft)
- Shape: cylindrical tower with balcony and lantern rising from a castle
- Markings: white (tower), black (lantern), ochre (trim)
- Operator: Northern Lighthouse Board (1787–1991), Museum of Scottish Lighthouses (1991–)
- Heritage: category A listed building
- Fog signal: siren: discontinued
- Deactivated: 1991
- Lens: hyperradiant Fresnel lens
- Intensity: 980 candela
- Characteristic: W Fl 15s
- New Kinnaird Head Lighthouse
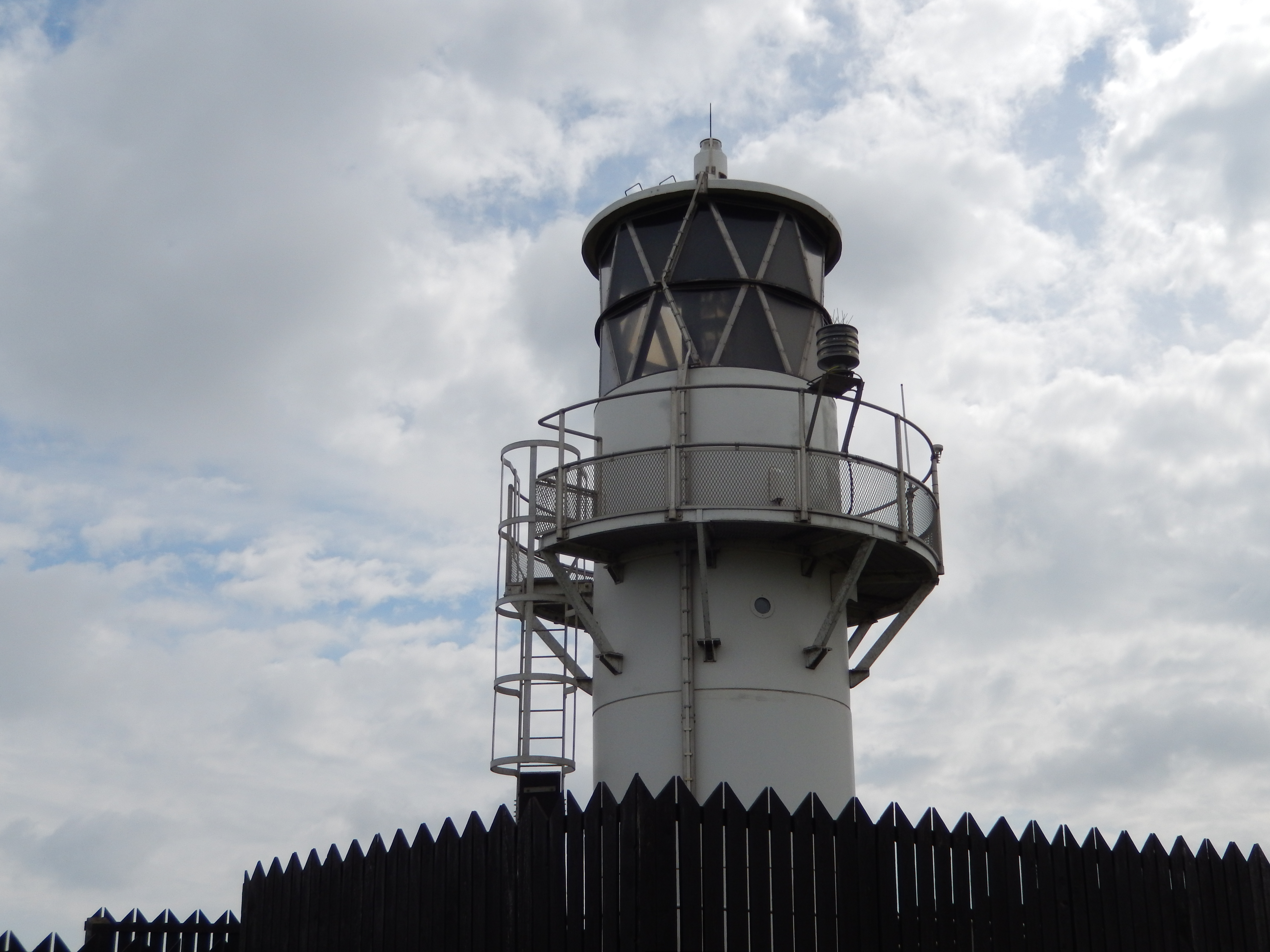
- Constructed: 1991
- Construction: fiberglass
- Height: 10 m (33 ft)
- Shape: cylindrical tower with balcony and lantern
- Markings: white
- Operator: Northern Lighthouse Board
- First lit: 1991
- Focal height: 25 m (82 ft)
- Intensity: 690,000 candela
- Range: 22 nmi (41 km; 25 mi)
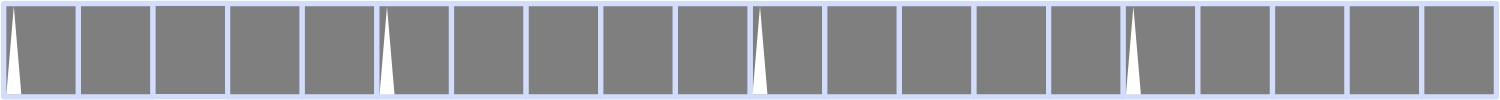
- Characteristic

There are two lighthouses located on Kinnaird Head, in Fraserburgh, Scotland: a historical one built in a converted castle; and its modern replacement, built in 1991.

The original lighthouse now forms part of the Museum of Scottish Lighthouses. The museum collection includes technical equipment relating to lighthouse illumination, navigation, and way making, as well as personal effects and small items that belonged to individual lightkeepers, including uniforms and hand-made model ships. Archival documents and photography from the operation of the lighthouse by the Northern Lighthouse Board are also part of the museum collection. The entire collection was recognised as nationally significant by the Scottish Government in June 2007.

== Construction ==
The original light at Kinnaird Head Lighthouse was established by Thomas Smith on 1 December 1787. A lantern was set 120 feet (37 m) above the sea on a tower of the old castle. Whale oil lamps produced a fixed light, each backed by a parabolic reflector. Kinnaird Head was the most powerful light of its time, and contained 17 reflectors arranged in 3 horizontal tiers. It was reported to be visible from 12 to 14 miles (10 to 12 nmi; 19 to 23 km). The first lighthouse keeper was James Park, who was paid a shilling per night and remained in the job for nearly a decade.

== Alterations ==
In 1824, internal alterations were made to construct a new lighthouse tower through the original castle tower. This tower supported a new lantern and reflector array by Robert Stevenson.

In 1851 Robert's son, Alan Stevenson, installed a first order dioptric lens at Kinnaird Head. The lens was standing and gave a fixed character. The site was further improved in 1853 with the site's first purpose-built accommodation blocks designed by brothers David and Thomas Stevenson.

David Alan Stevenson further upgraded the site in 1902 by installing a flashing lens apparatus. The hyperradiant Fresnel lens gave one flash every fifteen seconds and was visible for 25–27 miles. The lens was designed by David and his brother Charles Alexander Stevenson, and was made by the Chance Brothers. Only nine Scottish lights were given hyperradials, Hyskeir and Kinnaird Head being the only stations to retain their hyperradials today. A foghorn was also built and was operational from 1903, giving a 7-second blast every 90 seconds.

In 1906 the light was converted to incandescent operation. In 1929 Kinnaird Head became home to the first radio beacon in Scotland. The fog signal was discontinued in 1987, although the horn is still in place. The original lighthouse is no longer operational and is now home to the Museum of Scottish Lighthouses. A new automatic light was established beside the original light in 1991.

== Anniversary events ==
In 2012 the old Kinnaird Head Lighthouse was lit for two anniversary celebrations organised by the Museum of Scottish Lighthouses. First, on 2 June 2012 the light was exhibited in celebration of the Queen's Diamond Jubilee. The light was exhibited again on 1 December 2012 in celebration of Kinnaird Head's 225th anniversary. The light was lit at 3.31 pm, and extinguished at 8.30 the next morning, marking a full 17-hour shift.

== See also ==
- List of lighthouses in Scotland
- List of Northern Lighthouse Board lighthouses
