= Broch of Burrian =

- Broch of Burrian, interior

- Location within Orkney Islands
- 59.348129°N 2.418916°W
- Type: Broch
- Periods: Iron Age
- Location: North Ronaldsay

The Broch of Burrian is an Iron Age broch located on North Ronaldsay in the Orkney Islands, in Scotland (grid reference HY76275138).

== Location ==
The Broch of Burrian is located on the southern tip of North Ronaldsay in the Orkney Islands. The broch stands on a small headland next to a rocky shoreline. It is separated from the hinterland by a series of defensive earthworks.

== Description ==
The broch has an external diameter of 18 metres and an internal diameter of 9.5 metres. The entrance passage is on the southeast side, and the walls are solid. There is a small room in the inner wall of the broch on the northeast side. The broch is surrounded by outer defences consisting of the remains of four concentric ramparts on the landward side.

== Excavations ==
The Broch of Burrian was excavated by William Traill, proprietor of the island, in 1870 and 1871. A large number of artefacts, including a significant quantity of worked bone objects, were discovered. In addition, a number of artefacts of early historic or Pictish date were found. These include a cross-slab with ogham inscription, painted pebbles and part of an iron bell of Celtic type. Part of a Pictish house was uncovered to the north east side of the broch. The finds are now in the National Museum of Scotland.

The evidence suggests two phases of occupation, both dating to the Iron Age. In the second phase, the broch was converted into a sort of wheelhouse. The second phase went on for a long time, as there were clear Pictish elements among the finds, from as late as the 7th to the 9th centuries AD. Two items (the cross-slab and the iron bell) suggest early Christian activity, although there is as yet no other evidence for monastic settlement.
