= Robert Alan Mowbray Stevenson =

Scottish art critic

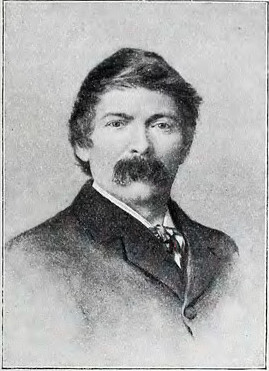
- Born: 25 March 1857; Edinburgh
- Died: 18 April 1900; Chiswick
- Education: Sidney Sussex College
- Occupations: Painter, art critic, music critic, university teacher, landscape painter
- Spouse: Harriett Louisa Purland
- Parents: Alan Stevenson (father); Margaret Scott Jones (mother)
- Relatives: Katharine de Mattos

Robert Alan Mowbray Stevenson (25 March 1847 – 18 April 1900) was a Scottish art critic, a cousin of the writer Robert Louis Stevenson and the brother of Katharine de Mattos. He was also an artist, painting landscapes and country figures.

== Life ==
He was the only son of the Scottish engineer, Alan Stevenson, and of Margaret Jones, his wife. He was born at Edinburgh on 25 March 1847, and educated at Windermere and at Sidney Sussex College, Cambridge, where he took no honours, but graduated B.A. in 1871 and M.A. in 1882.

He excelled as a gymnast and light-weight athlete; his favourite outdoor exercise was canoeing. His tastes in life were Bohemian, and the family profession did not attract him; but he was deeply interested in all the fine arts, especially the theory and practice. From boyhood he was close to his first cousin, Robert Louis Stevenson, his junior by three and a half years, who on the critical side of his mind owed much in youth to the stimulating company and influence of his cousin 'Bob.' For a year or two after taking his degree Stevenson continued to live with his widowed mother and sisters at Edinburgh, studying painting at the Edinburgh School of Art.

In 1873, he went to continue his studies at the Ecole des Beaux-Arts, Antwerp; then in Paris under Carolus Duran, and afterwards for several years at Barbizon and Grez-sur-Loing. His work in landscape painting, exhibited at the Royal Academy and elsewhere, was interesting and competent; but his incapacity for self-assertion and lack of commercial instinct would probably have hampered his career as an artist, even had his executive powers been greater than they were. Theory was his element, and about 1881 (in which year he married Louisa, daughter of Theodore Pyrland, esq.) his friends, foremost among them William Ernest Henley, began to urge him to turn his powers of exposition to practical account. In 1882, he taught a painting-class of undergraduates at Cambridge, in connection with the work of Mr. Sidney Colvin as Slade professor. From 1883 to 1889, he contributed much to the Saturday Review as a critic both of painting and music. In 1889, he was appointed professor of fine arts at University College, Liverpool, and, resigning that office in 1893, became for six years the regular art critic of the Pall Mall Gazette. He was also a contributor to the Magazine of Art and to the Portfolio monographs. In the autumn of 1899, his constitution showed signs of breaking up, and he died in his house at Chiswick on 18 April 1900.

== Works ==
None of Stevenson's newspaper criticisms have yet been reprinted. His books published in his lifetime are : Engraving, a translation from La Gravure of Vicomte H. Delaborde, 1886; The Devils of Notre Dame (text to accompany illustrations by Joseph Pennell), 1894; Peter Paul Rubens (reprinted, with additions, from Portfolio monographs), 1898; The Art of Velasquez, 1895; Velasquez (the same text revised and expanded in Williamson's series of 'Great Masters'), 1899. An essay on Raeburn, accompanying a volume of reproductions from that master's works, was published posthumously (1900).

Stevenson was the leader of a new school of art criticism in England. The aims and methods of 'impressionism' found in him a champion of rare brilliancy. At the same time, in dealing with the works of the living, he was scrupulously kind and fair towards other tendencies with which he was less in sympathy.

== Selected bibliography ==
- Engraving (1886)
- Peter Paul Rubens (1898)
- The Art of Velasquez (1895)
- Velasquez (1898)
- Essay on Raeburn.

== Sources ==
- "New Arabian Nights" (Copyright, 1905 by Charles Scribner's Sons, The Scribner Press)
