= Dennis Head Old Beacon =

- Location: North Ronaldsay, Orkney, Cross and Burness, United Kingdom
- OS grid: HY7901255392
- Coordinates: 59°23′03″N 2°22′17″W

Tower
- Constructed: 1789
- Designed by: Thomas Smith, Robert Stevenson
- Construction: stone tower
- Height: 21 m (69 ft)
- Shape: cylindrical tower and no lantern
- Markings: unpainted tower
- Heritage: scheduled monument

Light
- First lit: 10 October 1789
- Deactivated: 1809

Dennis Head Old Beacon is a ruined lighthouse on the island of North Ronaldsay, Orkney, Scotland. The beacon and keepers' houses are protected as a scheduled monument. It is one of the earliest surviving purpose-built lighthouse towers in Scotland.

== History ==
Calls for a lighthouse to be built on the island began in 1740 after the Swedish East Indiaman ship Svecia carrying cargo worth around £200,000 sank off the coast of North Ronaldsay. As a result of the sinking, the first survey of British waters was carried out by hydrographer Murdoch Mackenzie. However, a lighthouse was not approved on the island until the late 18th-century when tensions with France caused trouble for ships crossing the English Channel. Permission was then granted by the Commissioners of Northern Lighthouses for a lighthouse at Dennis Head to be built.

Construction on the 70-foot (21 m) tower began in 1788 under the supervision of Thomas Smith assisted by his stepson Robert Stevenson to designs by Ezekiel Walker. They used materials and workers from Leith. It was completed the following year and was first lit on 10 October 1789. The total cost of construction was £199 12s 6d. It was to be the first of many island lighthouses for Smith (he had previously worked on the lights at Kinnaird Head and Mull of Kintyre).

Its lighting system, although advanced for its time, consisting of a cluster of oil-burning lamps and reflectors was not very effective, often being mistaken for the mast-head of another ship by mariners. In 1809, with the construction of other nearby lighthouses, it was decided that the lighthouse was no longer required, and the light was extinguished.

Another lighthouse, North Ronaldsay Lighthouse, was built on the island in 1852.

The Old Beacon featured on the 2006 BBC television series Restoration Village, finishing in third place.

== Architecture ==
The majority of the lighthouse was constructed using local undressed stone, apart from the corbels and a spiral staircase, the latter of which collapsed in the lighthouse resulting in some projecting stubs from the walls. Two lightkeepers houses was also built beside the western side of tower. However, the houses are currently roofless.

After it was extinguished, the light at the top of the tower was replaced with a large masonry ball 8-foot (2.4 m) in diameter.
