= W. S. De Mattos =

British socialist activist

W. S. de Mattos
- Born: 10 January 1851; Clapham
- Spouse: Katharine Stevenson

William Sydney De Mattos (10 January 1851 – fl.1909) was a British socialist activist.

Born in Clapham, De Mattos graduated in mathematics from Trinity College, Cambridge, becoming captain of Cambridge University A.F.C. He then worked as a private tutor for the university and the British Army. He became interested in radical politics, and eventually became a socialist.

In 1874, De Mattos married Katharine Stevenson, an author and the cousin of Robert Louis Stevenson, but the marriage was soon in trouble, and the two separated early in the 1880s.

De Mattos joined the Democratic Federation, and then the Fabian Society, for which he lectured widely, and was a founder of many local Fabian societies. For some years, he served on the society's executive committee. His travels inspired him to launch "red van" campaigns, where a group of socialist lecturers toured rural areas, giving speeches from a van painted red. He also wrote articles for the Sunday Chronicle, the Weekly Times and Echo and the Dispatch.

De Mattos was associated with the General Railway Workers' Union, working for a time as a union organiser, and also becoming a trustee of the union. By the end of the 1890s, he had emigrated to Canada, where he lived until at least 1909.
