= Hyskeir =

Islet in Scotland

Coordinates: 56.9709°N 6.6763°W

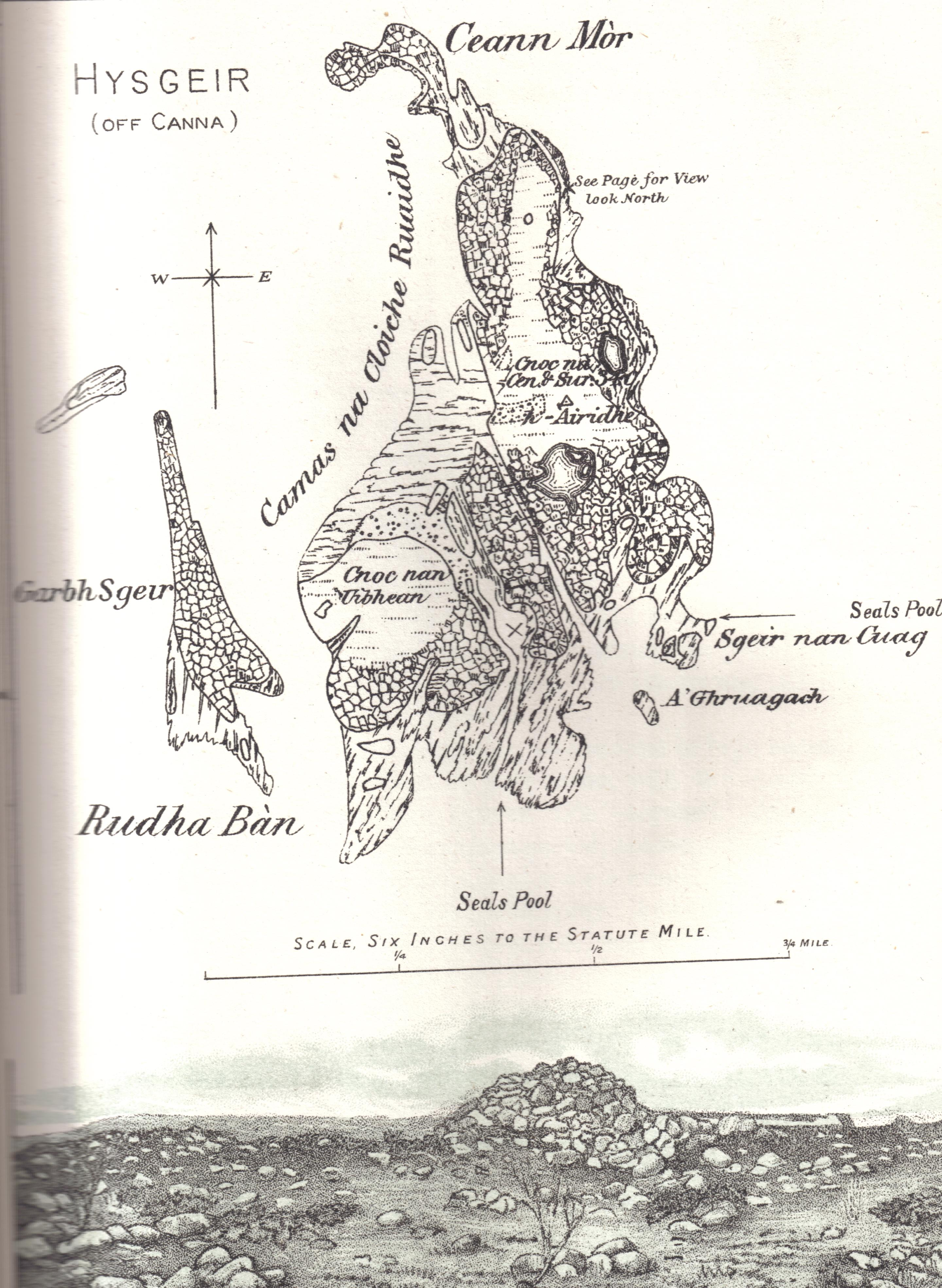
The island in 1892.

Hyskeir (Scottish Gaelic: Òigh-sgeir) or Heyskeir is a low-lying rocky islet (a skerry) in the Inner Hebrides, Scotland. The Hyskeir Lighthouse marks the southern entrance to the Minch.

== Geography ==
Hyskeir lies in the southern entrance to the Minch, 11 kilometres southwest of the island of Canna and 14 kilometres west of Rùm. Garbh Sgeir is a rock that lies next to the islet and the landing place for Hyskeir lies in the channel between the two. Both islands are unoccupied.

Òigh-sgeir is composed of hexagonal pitchstone columns.

The owner of the island in the 19th and early 20th centuries was Philip Ollas. At that time sheep from Canna were brought to make use of the summer grazing.

== Etymology ==
Hyskeir is from the Old Norse sker meaning skerry. Òigh-sgeir is Gaelic for 'maiden' or 'virgin rock', sgeir also meaning skerry. The English name 'Maiden Rock' has also been used.

== Lighthouse ==
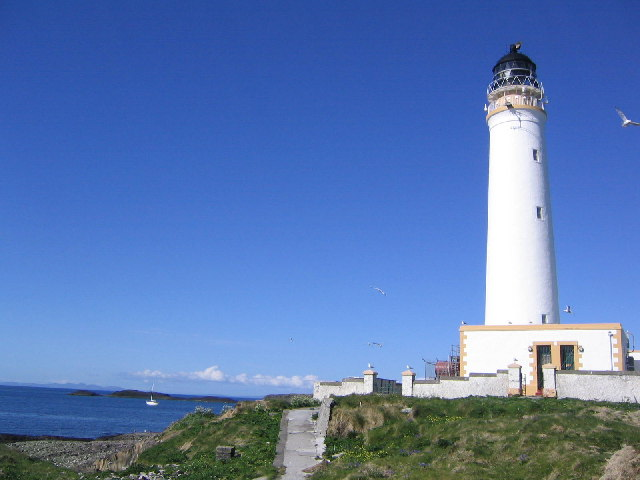
Hyskeir Lighthouse

Hyskeir Lighthouse was established in 1904. The 39-metre-high (128 ft) building marks the southern end of the Minch, warning of the presence of the Mills Rocks, the island of Canna and Hyskeir itself. It was designed by David and Charles Stevenson and constructed by Oban contractor Messrs D & J MacDougall. The white tower was staffed until March 1997, becoming one of the last lighthouses in Scotland to be automated. The keepers were briefly known for their one-hole golf course following their appearance on television.

Hyskeir and its lighthouse feature extensively in Peter Hill's 2003 book Stargazing: Memoirs of a Young Lighthouse Keeper.

== Wildlife ==
Gavin Maxwell, who fished for basking sharks nearby in 1947, recorded a mass sighting of these sharks; “It was a gigantic shoal ... At one moment we counted 54 dorsal fins in sight at the same time.”

The island has nesting sites for Arctic and common tern, kittiwakes and eider ducks and also has a large seal colony.

== See also ==
- List of islands of Scotland

== Footnotes ==
- Murray, W.H. (1966) The Hebrides. London. Heinemann.
