= Hyskeir Lighthouse =

Hyskeir Lighthouse Òigh Sgeir
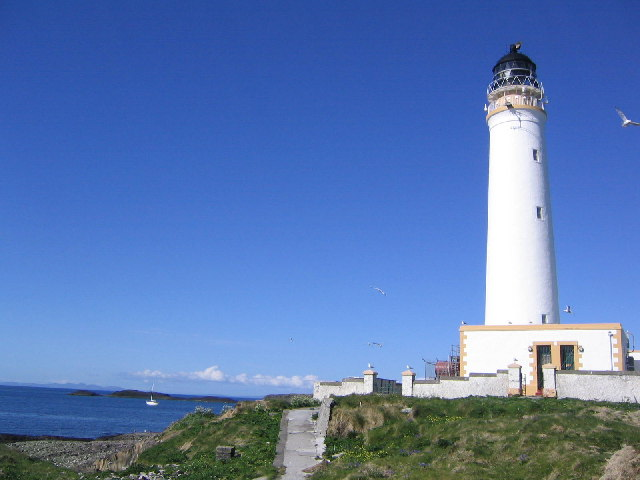
- Hyskeir Light, May 2005
- Location: Hyskeir Isle
- OS grid: NM15529626
- Coordinates: 56°58′09.7″N 6°40′49.6″W

Tower
- Constructed: 1904
- Designed by: David Alan Stevenson, Charles Alexander Stevenson
- Construction: masonry tower
- Automated: 1997
- Height: 39 metres (128 ft)
- Shape: cylindrical tower with balcony and lantern attached to 1-storey keeper's house
- Markings: white tower, black lantern, ochre trim
- Operator: Northern Lighthouse Board

Light
- Focal height: 41 metres (135 ft)
- Lens: hyperradiant Fresnel lens
- Intensity: 788,000 candela
- Range: 24 nautical miles (44 km; 28 mi)
- Characteristic: Fl (3) W 30s.

Hyskeir Lighthouse in Scotland was established in 1904. The 39-metre-high (128 ft) lighthouse marks the southern end of The Minch, warning of the presence of the Mills Rocks, Canna, and Hyskeir itself. It was designed by David and Charles Stevenson and constructed by Oban contractor Messrs D & J MacDougall.

The white tower was staffed until March 1997, becoming one of the last lighthouses in Scotland to be automated. The keepers were briefly known for their one-hole golf course following their appearance on TV. Now controlled by the Northern Lighthouse Board in Edinburgh, it displays three white flashes every thirty seconds.

Hyskeir and its lighthouse feature extensively in Peter Hill's 2003 book Stargazing: Memoirs of a Young Lighthouse Keeper.

== See also ==
- List of lighthouses in Scotland
- List of Northern Lighthouse Board lighthouses
