= Katharine de Mattos =

Scottish author and journalist

- Born: 1851
- Died: 1939 (aged 87–88)
- Spouse: W. S. De Mattos
- Father: Alan Stevenson
- Relatives: Robert Alan Mowbray Stevenson (brother)

Katharine Elizabeth Alan de Mattos (née Stevenson; 1851–1939) was a Scottish author and journalist. She was the youngest daughter of Margaret Scott Jones, daughter of Humphrey Herbert Jones of Anglesey and the lighthouse engineer, Alan Stevenson. Her brother was the art critic Robert Alan Mowbray Stevenson.

In June 1874 she married, against the wishes of her family, W. S. De Mattos, known as a "Cambridge atheist". His constant infidelities led to their separation. At the age of 30, Katharine moved to London with their two children and, with help from her cousin Robert Louis Stevenson and his friend William Ernest Henley, supported herself by journalism. She was a regular contributor to the Saturday Review and the Magazine of Art. The Strange Case of Dr Jekyll and Mr Hyde opens with a dedication to Katharine de Mattos.

In 1888, Fanny Stevenson published a short story, "The Nixie", which Henley recognized as based on Katharine's idea they had discussed the previous year. He wrote to Robert Louis (Fanny's husband): "Why there wasn’t a double signature is what I’ve not been able to understand". This accusation of plagiarism led to a bitter quarrel and rupture of the Stevensons with Henley and de Mattos.

Later, Katharine wrote under the pseudonym Theodor Hertz-Garten. Some of her poems appeared in Sylvia's Journal and the Windsor Magazine. She penned some 1,300 anonymous book reviews for The Athenaeum. The Yellow Book published her poem In a Gallery: Portrait of a Lady (Unknown). Little is known about her life after 1908.

== Publications ==
- Through the Red Litten Windows and The old river house, 1892 (a novel) London Fischer Unwin 1892. OCLC 1014539602
