= Garbh Sgeir =

Rock in Scotland

Coordinates: 56°58′8″N 6°41′01″W

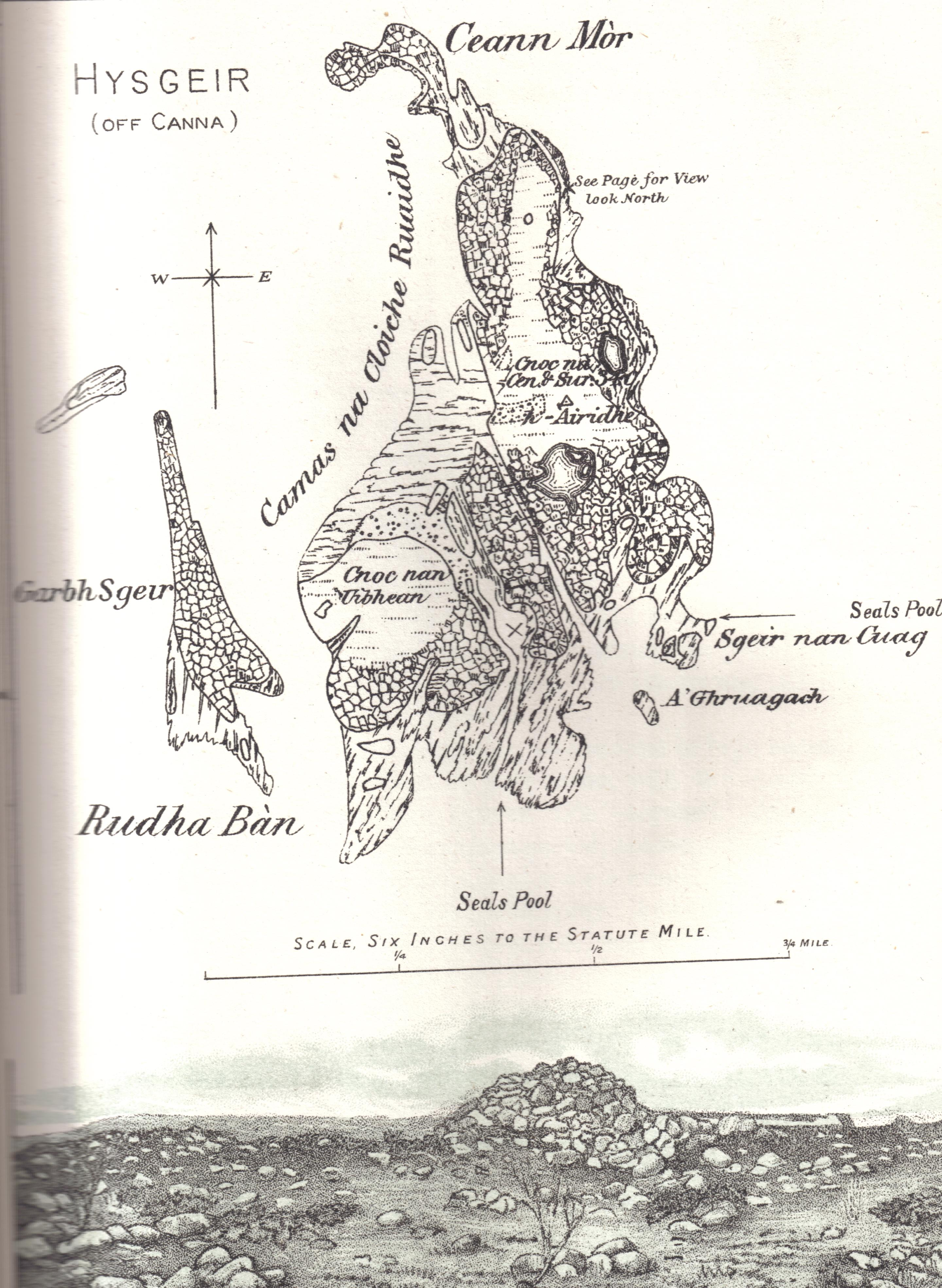
Garb Sgeir at the western margin of the 1892 map

Garbh Sgeir (Gaelic: 'rough skerry') is a rock about 100 metres west of the islet Òigh-sgeir, in the Small Isles, Lochaber, Scotland. There is an anchorage between the two.

It is not to be confused with the nearby islet of the same name that lies 400 m east of the southern tip of the island of Eigg, north of Eilean Chathastail.

The rock is home to a large colony of seabirds, and is protected by Scottish Natural Heritage.
