= Capo Peloro Lighthouse =

Lighthouse in Messina, Sicily, Italy

Capo Peloro
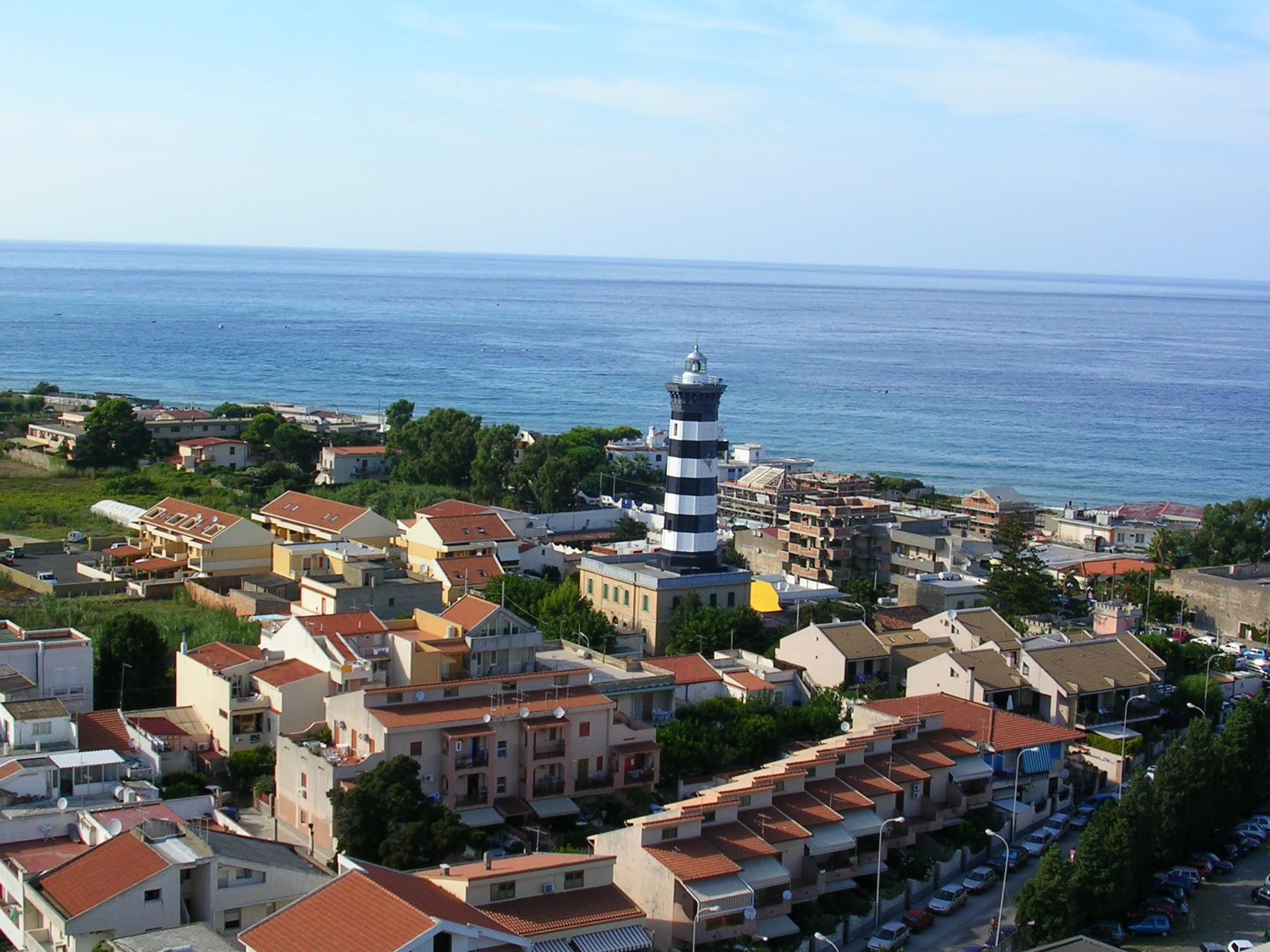
- Capo Peloro Lighthouse
- Location: Capo Peloro; Messina; Sicily; Italy
- Coordinates: 38°16′06″N 15°39′02″E

Tower
- Constructed: 1853 (first)
- Foundation: masonry base
- Construction: masonry tower
- Height: 37 metres (121 ft) (current); 42 metres (138 ft) (first)
- Shape: octagonal prism tower with balcony and lantern atop 1-storey keeper’s house
- Markings: white and black horizontal bands tower, grey metallic lantern dome
- Power source: mains electricity
- Operator: Marina Militare
- Heritage: Italian national heritage
- Racon: M

Light
- First lit: 1884 (current)
- Deactivated: 1884 (first)
- Focal height: 37 metres (121 ft)
- Lens: type OR D4
- Intensity: AL 1000 W
- Range: main: 19 nautical miles (35 km; 22 mi) reserve: 13 nautical miles (24 km; 15 mi)
- Characteristic: Fl (2) G 10s. Iso R 5s. at 22 metres (72 ft)
- Italy no.: 2736 E.F.

Capo Peloro Lighthouse (Italian: Faro di Capo Peloro) is an active lighthouse located in Punta del Faro on the Strait of Messina, the most north-eastern promontory of Sicily, settled in the Province of Messina, the place closest to Calabria.

== Description ==
The first lighthouse was built in 1853, then rebuilt in 1884 and heavily damaged by the 1908 Messina earthquake. The original lighthouse was a tapered octagonal prism tower 42 metres (138 ft) high with balcony and lantern. The lighthouse was inactive for a long time, then it was restored but the height was shortened to the current. The lighthouse consists of an octagonal prism tower, 37 metres (121 ft) high, painted with black and white bands, with balcony and lantern, rising from a 1-storey white masonry keeper's house. The lantern, painted in grey metallic, is positioned at 37 metres (121 ft) above sea level and emits two green flashes in a 10 seconds period, visible up to a distance of 19 nautical miles (35 km; 22 mi). Another light positioned at 22 metres (72 ft) emits a red flash on and off in a 5 seconds period. The lighthouse is completely automated, powered by the mains power and is operated by the Marina Militare with the identification code number 2736 E.F.

== See also ==
- List of lighthouses in Italy
- Punta del Faro
