= Alan Stevenson =

Scottish civil engineer

Alan Stevenson FRSE
- Born: 28 April 1807; Edinburgh, Scotland
- Died: 23 December 1865 (aged 58); Portobello, Edinburgh, Scotland
- Education: Royal High School, Edinburgh
- Alma mater: University of Edinburgh
- Occupation: Lighthouse engineer
- Employer: Northern Lighthouse Board
- Known for: lighthouse design Skerryvore Lighthouse
- Spouse: Margaret Scott Jones (1813–1895)
- Children: Robert Alan Mowbray Stevenson; Jean Margaret Alan Stevenson; Dorothea Francis Alan Stevenson; Katharine Elizabeth Alan Stevenson
- Parent(s): Robert Stevenson (father); Jean Smith (mother)
- Relatives: David Stevenson (brother); Thomas Stevenson (brother); Robert Louis Stevenson (nephew)

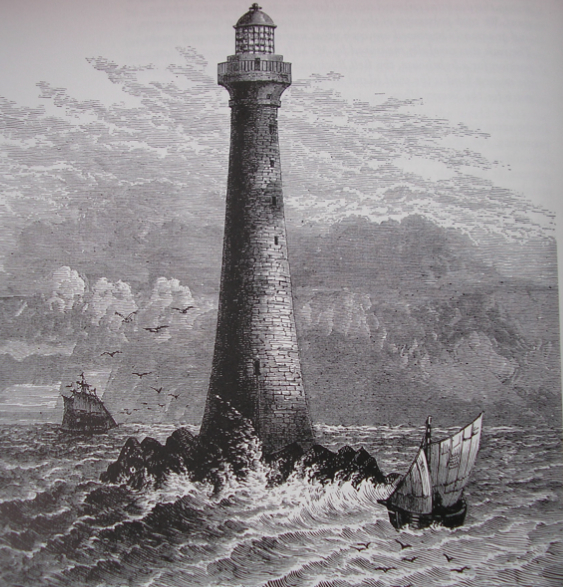
Skerryvore Lighthouse

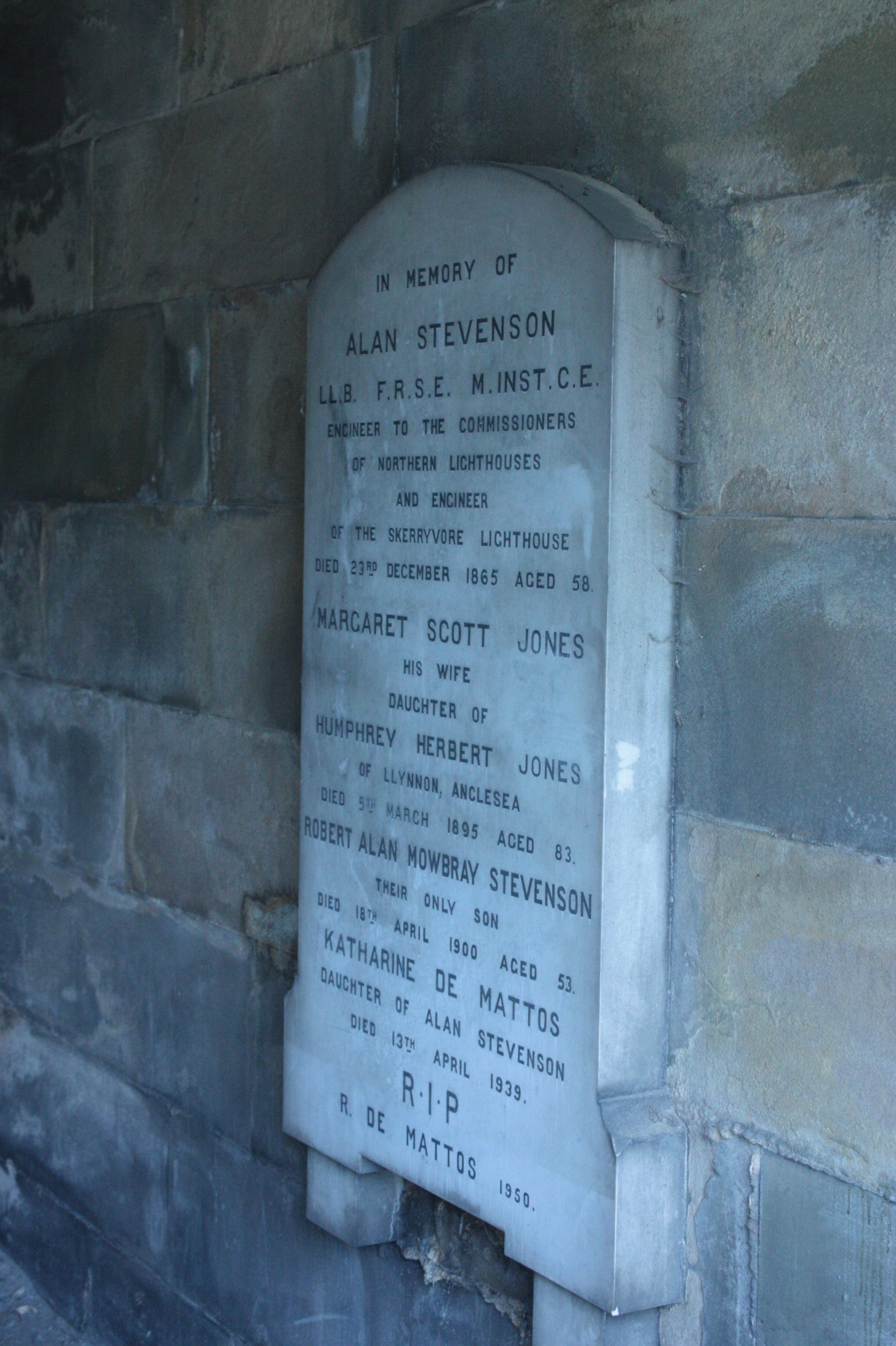
Alan Stevenson's grave, New Calton Cemetery

Alan Stevenson FRSE MInstCE (28 April 1807 – 23 December 1865) was a Scottish civil engineer, known for designing and building lighthouses in and around Scotland.

== Life ==
Alan Stevenson was born in Edinburgh on 28 April 1807, the eldest son of Jean Smith and her husband (and step-brother) Robert Stevenson. With his father, and brothers David and Thomas, he was part of a notable family of engineers and lighthouse builders. The writer Robert Louis Stevenson was his nephew.

He was educated at the High School in Edinburgh. In 1821, he attended the University of Edinburgh to study Latin, Greek and mathematics with a view to becoming a member of the clergy. However, 2 years later in 1823, he decided to pursue a career in engineering and began a four-year apprenticeship at his father's business.

Between 1843 and 1853 he built 13 lighthouses in and around Scotland. Among his notable works is the Skerryvore Lighthouse.

He was Engineer in Chief to the Northern Lighthouse Board from 1843 to 1853.

In 1838 he was elected a Fellow of the Royal Society of Edinburgh his proposer being James David Forbes. In 1840 the University of Glasgow conferred on him an honorary LLB degree.

He died at 13 Pitt Street (later renamed Pittville St.) in Portobello on 23 December 1865.

He is buried in the Stevenson family vault in New Calton Cemetery with his wife, Margaret Scott Jones. The vault lies midway along the eastern wall.

== Publications ==
- Biographical Sketches of the Late Robert Stevenson (1861)

== Family ==
On 11 September 1844, he married Margaret Scott Jones (1813–1895), daughter of Jean (née Scott) and Humphrey Herbert Jones of Anglesey. They had three daughters, Jean, Dorothea and the author and journalist Katherine Elizabeth de Mattos Stevenson (1851–1939), and one son, art critic Robert Alan Mowbray Stevenson (1827–1880).

He was uncle to Robert Louis Stevenson, Charles Alexander Stevenson and David Alan Stevenson.

== Lighthouses by Alan Stevenson ==
- Little Ross (1843)
- Isle of May Low Light (1843)
- Skerryvore (1844)
- Covesea Skerries (1846)
- Chanonry Point (1846)
- Cromarty (1846)
- Cairn Point, Loch Ryan (1847)
- Noss Head (1849)
- Ardnamurchan (1849)
- Sanda Island Lighthouse (1850)
- Hestan Island (1850)
- Hoy High and Hoy Low, Graemsay (1851)
- Arnish Point (1853)
- Eilean Musdile (Lismore)

== Arms ==
Coat of arms of Alan Stevenson
| Notes Granted 7th April 1865 by George Burnett, Lyon Depute. Crest A dexter hand holding a wreath of laurel Proper. Escutcheon Argent on a chevron between two fleurs de lys in chief Azure and a lighthouse in base Proper three mullets of the field. Motto Ceolum Non Solum |

== Publications ==
- Biographical Sketch of the Late Robert Stevenson: Civil Engineer, read at the Royal Society of Edinburgh, at the meeting of 17 February 1851. From Google Book Search
- A Rudimentary Treatise on the History, Construction and Illumination of Lighthouses, 1850, from Google Book Search

== Family Tree ==
Alan's position in the Stevenson family tree.

Robert Stevenson engineering family tree

Thomas Smith (engineer) | Jean Lille Stevenson
Joan Smith
David Stevenson (engineer) | Alan Stevenson (engineer)
Charles Alexander Stevenson (engineer) | David Alan Stevenson (engineer)
D. Alan Stevenson (engineer)

Alan Stevenson (merchant)
Robert Stevenson (civil engineer)
Thomas Stevenson (engineer)
Robert Louis Stevenson
