= Faro Point =

Northeastern point of Sicily, Italy

Coordinates: 38.2647°N 15.6508°E

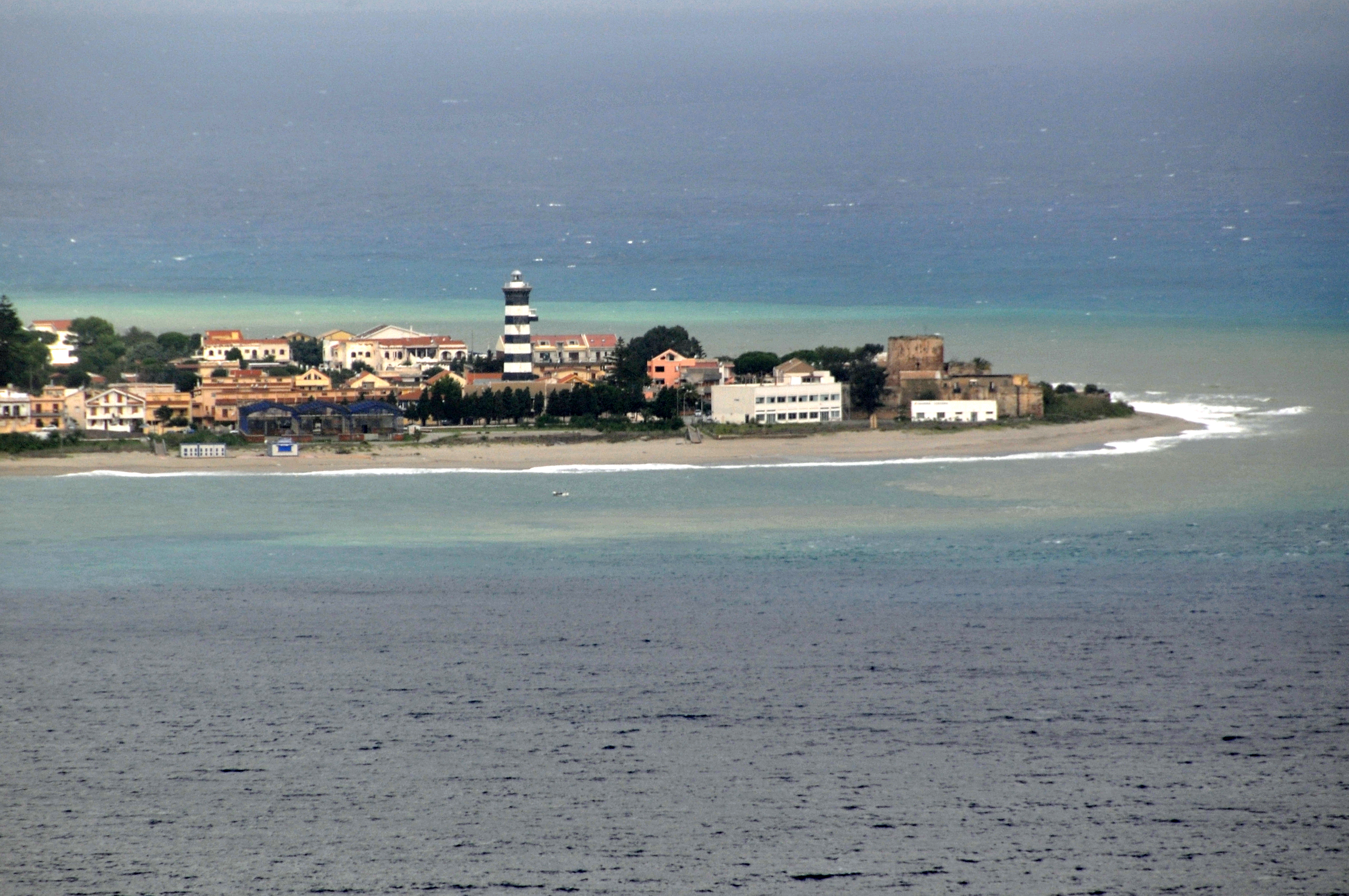
Capo Peloro with its lighthouse and its fort

Faro Point (Italian: Punta del Faro) or Peloro Cape (Italian: Capo Peloro; Sicilian: Capu Piloru) (Note: Ancient Greek: Πέλωρος ἄκρα, romanized: Pélōros ákrā (Ptolemy), Πελωρίς Pelōrís (Thucydides, Dion. Per.), or Πελωριάς Pelōriás (Polybius, Strabo); Latin: Pelorus, Peloris, or Pelorias.) is the northeastern promontory of Sicily situated in Messina district at northeast of the city.

The village is connected to the city center by two ATM bus lines: line 32 (Ponte Gallo–Mortelle–Terminal Museo) and shuttle line 1 (Giampilieri Superiore–Torre Faro).

In antiquity it was considered a possible dwelling place of the mythological Sirens, along with a few other mediterranean locations, like the islands of Sirenuse or Capri.

== Historical significance ==
As the ancient Pelorus, Punta del Faro is one of the most celebrated promontories of Sicily, forming the northeastern extremity of the whole island, and one of the three promontories which were considered to give to it the triangular form from which it derived the name of Trinacria. It was at the same time the point which projected farthest towards the opposite coast of Italy; so that the narrowest part of the Sicilian straits was that which lay between Cape Pelorus and the coast adjoining the headland of Caenys (Italian Cenide, modern Punta del Pezzo) on the coast of Bruttium (modern Calabria), therefore the nearest points of the Strait of Messina.

A strange story is told by some Roman writers that it derived its ancient name from the pilot of Hannibal, who was put to death by that general from a suspicion of treachery; thus overlooking the fact that it was known by that name to the Greeks for centuries before the time of Hannibal. The actual headland of Pelorus, now called the Capo del Faro, is a low, sandy point, but about 3 km from its extremity there begins a ridge of hills which quickly rises into a range of mountains, of no great elevation, but steep and strongly marked. These continue in an unbroken range at the back of Messina, near which they attain a height of about 1000 m, and flank the east coast of the island as far as the neighborhood of Taormina, where they turn abruptly to the west and stretch across in that direction without any real interruption, until they join the more lofty group of the Monte Madonia. It is to this range of mountains that the name of "Mons Neptunius" is applied by Solinus called today mounts Peloritani, and which that author describes as separating the Tyrrhenian and Adriatic (i.e. Sicilian) seas. But there is no real geographical line of separation between these mountains and those farther west, which were known to the ancients as the "Mons Nebrodes".

The headland of Pelorus may thus be looked upon as the extremity of a great mountain promontory, formed by the range of the Mons Neptunius, and extending from the neighbourhood of Messina to that of Milazzo (ancient Mylae), or, in a still wider sense, from Taormina (ancient Tauromenium) on the east coast to Tindari (ancient Tyndaris) on the north. Diodorus calls it 100 stadia from the promontory to Messana, and the distance is still commonly reckoned near 20 km, though it does not really exceed 13 km. (Diod. xiv. 56.)

From its proximity to Messana and its position commanding the passage of the straits, Pelorus was an important naval station, and as such its name is frequently mentioned in history. Thus, in 425 BCE, when the Athenian fleet under Laches was established at Rhegium (modern Reggio di Calabria), the Syracusans and their allies took post with their fleet at Pelorus, where they were supported also by a land force. In 396 BCE the Carthaginian general Himilco took post at Pelorus with his fleet and army, and, when the Messanians sallied out to attack him, by taking advantage of a north wind, sent his fleet down suddenly to Messana, which was surprised and taken before the troops could return to its defence. Again, during the siege of Messana by the Carthaginians: at the commencement of the First Punic War; it was at Pelorus that their fleet was stationed, with the view both of threatening the city and preventing the Romans from crossing the straits. And at a later period, during the contest between Octavian and Sextus Pompey in the neighborhood of Messana, the headland of Pelorus once more became an important post, being one of the points sedulously guarded by Pompey in order to prevent his adversary from effecting a landing.

The actual promontory of Pelorus, as already mentioned, is a low spit or point of sand, about 3 km in length, which has evidently been thrown up by the currents, which flow with great rapidity through the straits. A tradition, reported by Diodorus, but as ancient as the time of Hesiod, represented it as an artificial work constructed by the giant Orion. Within this sandy point, between the beach and the hills, are enclosed two small lakes or pools which are famous for producing the best eels and cockles in Sicily, a reputation they already enjoyed in ancient times, as the cockles of Pelorus are repeatedly noticed by Athenaeus; and Solinus, who mentions the lakes in question, speaks of them as abounding in fish. There appear to have been three of them in his day, but the marvels which he relates of one of them are purely fabulous. A temple of Neptune stood in ancient times upon the promontory, as well as a lighthouse or Pharos, the memory of which is retained in the modern name of Punta del Faro, by which the cape is still known. This appellation seems to have indeed come into use before the close of the Roman Empire, as Servius, in describing the width of the Sicilian strait, measures it a Columna usque ad Pharon. But no remains of either building are now visible.

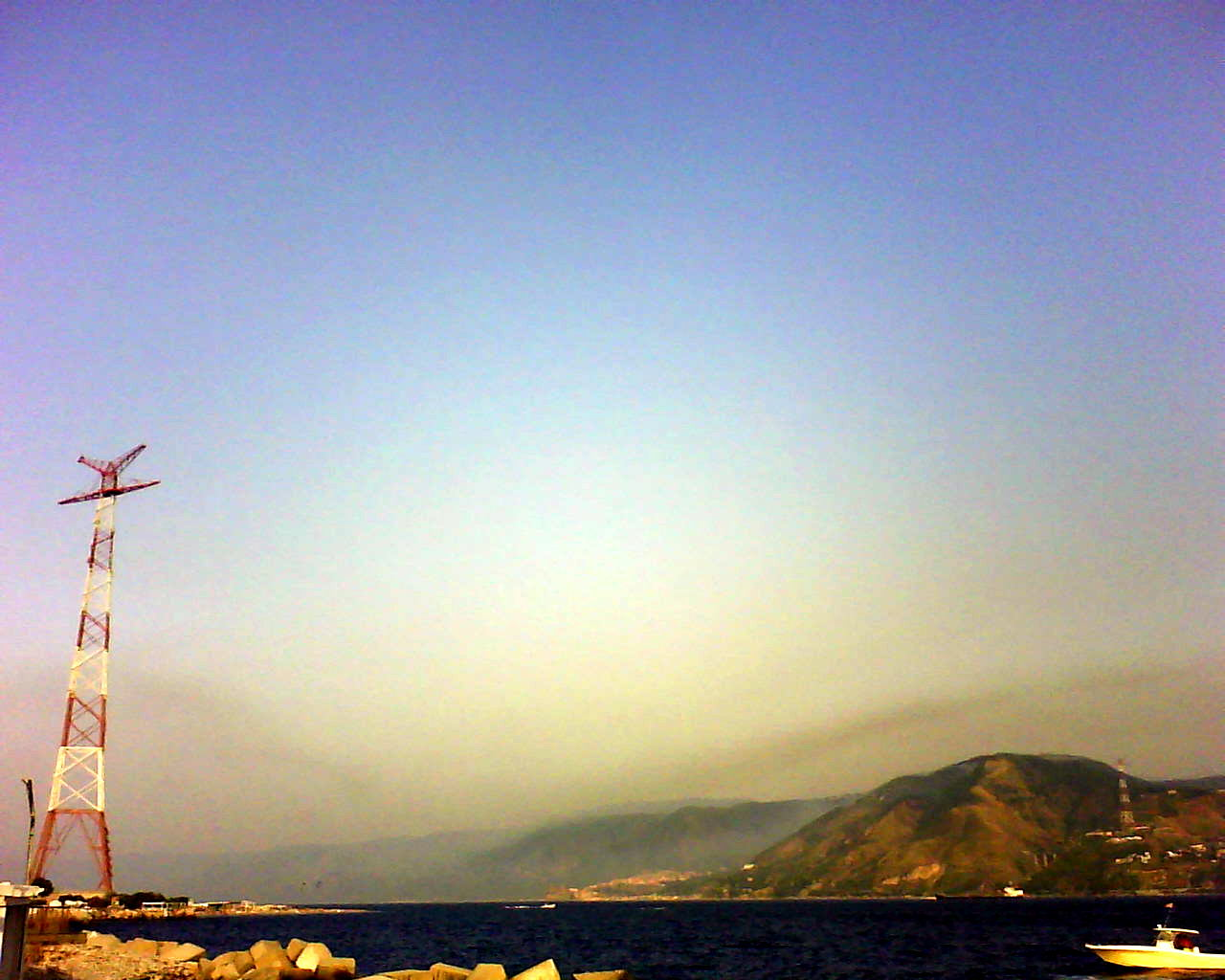
Capo Peloro 2021

== See also ==
- Capo Peloro Lighthouse
- Odyssey
- Sirens
- Alpos
- History of Taormina
