= Pladda Lighthouse =

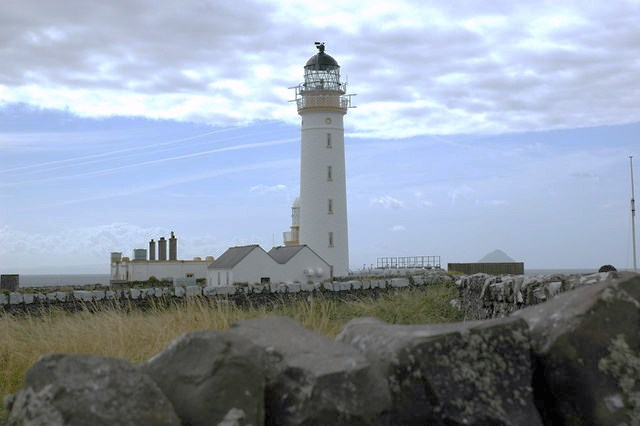
- Pladda High Lighthouse
- Location: Pladda, North Ayrshire, United Kingdom
- Coordinates: 55°25′30″N 5°07′06″W

Tower
- Constructed: 1790
- Built by: Thomas Smith
- Construction: masonry (tower)
- Automated: 1990
- Height: 29 m (95 ft)
- Shape: cylinder
- Markings: White (tower), black (lantern), ochre (trim)
- Operator: Northern Lighthouse Board

Light
- Focal height: 40 m (130 ft)
- Lens: hyperradiant Fresnel lens
- Range: 17 nmi (31 km; 20 mi)
- Characteristic: Fl(3) W 30s

Pladda Lighthouse is an active 18th century lighthouse situated at the southern end of the island of Pladda in western Scotland. The lighthouse dates from 1790 and was designed by Thomas Smith. It was the first light on the Clyde to be commissioned by the Commissioners of the Northern Lights. It had both an upper and a lower light to distinguish it from the three other lighthouses in the Firth of Clyde.

In 1876, Pladda was about the third station to have a foghorn. The "double lights" were replaced by a powerful flashing system in 1901. Lightkeepers were withdrawn in 1990 when the lighthouse was automated; it is now remotely monitored from the Northern Lighthouse Board's headquarters in Edinburgh.

The lighthouse tower is 29 metres (95 ft) in height; there are 128 steps to the top. Under normal conditions, its light (three white flashes every 30 seconds) is visible for 17 nautical miles (31 kilometres).

== In popular culture ==
Pladda and its lighthouse feature extensively in Peter Hill's 2003 book Stargazing: Memoirs of a Young Lighthouse Keeper. They were also filming locations for "Queen Victoria Syndrome", the first episode of season 5 of The Crown.

== See also ==
- List of lighthouses in Scotland
- List of Northern Lighthouse Board lighthouses
