= Alpos =

Giant in Greek mythology, son of Uranus and Gaea

In Greek mythology, Alpos (Ancient Greek: Ἄλπον) was Sicilian giant son of Gaea (Earth).

== Description ==
Like the Hundred-Handed Ones, Alpos had many arms, and his head was covered with vipers, like Medusa:

Alpos with a hundred vipers on his head for hair, who touched the Sun, and pulled back the Moon, and tormented the company of stars with his tresses.

Alpos bent his knee, that son of Earth with huge body rising near the clouds.

== Mythology ==
Alpos once terrorized Pelorus (modern day: Punta del Faro) in Sicily as described by Nonnus in his Dionysiaca:

No wayfarer then climbed the height of that rock, for fear of the raging Giant and his row of mouths; and if one in ignorance travelled on that forbidden road whipping a bold horse, the son of Earth spied him, pulled him over the rock with a tangle of many hands, entombed man and colt in his gullet! Often some old shepherd leading his sheep to pasture along the wooded hillside at midday was gobbled up. In those days melodious Pan never sat beside herds of goats or sheepcotes playing his tune on the assembled reeds, no imitating Echo returned the sounds of his pipes; but prattler as she was, silence sealed those lips which were wont to sound with the pipe of Pan never silent, because the Giant then oppressed all. No cowherd then came, no band of woodmen cutting timbers for a ship troubled the Nymphs of the trees, their age-mates, no clever shipwright clamped together a barge, the woodriveted car that travels the roads of the sea...

Eventually, the giant was killed by Dionysus with his thyrsus in an epic battle:

... for my Dionysos with his flesh-cutting ivy shore through Alpos,' that godfighting son of Earth...

Then avoid the divine hand of Dionysos Giantslayer, who once beside the base of Tyrsenian Peloros smashed Alpos,' the son of Earth who fought against gods, battering with rocks and throwing hills:

... until Bacchos on his travels passed by that peak, shaking his Euian thyrsus. As Lyaios passed, the huge son of Earth high as the clouds attacked him. A rock was the shield upon his shoulders, a hilltop was his missile; he leapt on Bacchos, with a tall tree which he found near for a pike, some pine or planetree to cast at Dionysos. A pine was his club, and he pulled up an olive spire from the roots to whirl for a quick sword. But when he had stript the whole mountain for his long shots, and the ridge was bare of all the thick shady trees, then Bacchos thyrsus-wild sped his own shot whizzing as usual to the mark, and hit this towering Alpos full in the wide throat — right through the gullet went the sharp point of the greeny spear. Then the Giant pierced with the sharp little thyrsus rolled over half dead and fell in the neighbouring sea, filling the whole deephollowed abyss of the bay. He lifted the waters and deluged Typhaon's rock, flooding the hot surface of his brother's bed and cooling his scorched body with a torrent of water.

Alpos who does not appear elsewhere in Greek mythology, and received no cult, may be considered an invention of the fertile imagination of Nonnus.
