= North Ronaldsay =

Island in Scotland

Raghnallsaigh a Tuath (Gaelic)
- A view of the house and loch at Garso on North Ronaldsay, with the lighthouse in the distance

Location
- North Ronaldsay shown within Orkney
- OS grid reference: HY759542
- Coordinates: 59.37°N 2.42°W

Name
- Name meaning: Old Norse, possibly "Ringa's Isle"
- Old Norse name: Rínansey

Physical geography
- Island group: Orkney
- Area: 690 hectares (2.7 sq mi)
- Area rank: 64
- Highest elevation: 20 metres (66 ft)

Administration
- Council area: Orkney Islands
- Country: Scotland
- Sovereign state: United Kingdom

Demographics
- Population: 59
- Population rank: 53
- Population density: 8.5 people/km^{2}
- Largest settlement: Hollandstoun

North Ronaldsay (Scots pronunciation: [nɒrθ ˈrɒnəltsiː], also [nɒrθ ˈrɒnəldziː] north-RON-əlt-see) is the northernmost island in the Orkney archipelago of Scotland. With an area of 690 hectares (2.7 sq mi), it is the fourteenth-largest. It is mentioned in the Orkneyinga saga; in modern times it is known for its historic lighthouse, migratory bird life and unusual breed of sheep.

== Etymology ==
The earliest written reference to the island appears in the 13th-century Orkneyinga saga where it is called Rínansey. Schei states that the name means ‘the island of St Ninian’. However, according to Thomson, although Christianity existed in Orkney prior to the arrival of the Norse, and a possible derivation of the name is ‘St Ringan's island’, (Note: Thomson is referring to Hugh Marwick’s "Orkney Farm Names", p.1 but is seemingly not convinced and writes that Rínansey is “supposedly St Ringan’s island”.) the references to Ninian in the Northern Isles date from the 12th century rather than being pre-Norse. Haswell-Smith suggests the more prosaic 'Ringa's Isle' and emphasises that the Norse name precludes a link to the name Rögnvaldr.

Schei states that the name was pronounced "Rinnalsay" and by the 14th century it had become confused with Rognvaldsey, in the south of Orkney and that they were renamed North Ronaldsay and South Ronaldsay to distinguish them from each other.

Irvine's 2006 reprint of Blaeu's Atlas Novus of 1654 contains various references to North Ronaldsay including:-

- Ranalsa septentrionalis in the original Latin text
- The name “North Ranals Øy” on Blaeu's map.

== Geography ==
North Ronaldsay lies around 4 kilometres (2.5 mi) north of its nearest neighbour, Sanday, at grid reference HY759542. It is around 5 kilometres (3.1 mi) long and is defined by two large sandy bays; Linklet Bay on the eastern shoreline and South Bay at the south. The west of the island is very rocky, with many skerries. North Ronaldsay is low-lying and exposed; its climate is extremely changeable and frequently inclement. The surrounding waters are stormy and treacherous, and have been a notorious "graveyard" for ships (hence the unusually early provision of a lighthouse on the island).

Hollandstoun at the south of the island is the most sizable settlement; it lies roughly equidistant from the airfield and the pier. North Ronaldsay is home to a bird observatory.

A 1.8 m (6 ft) dry stone dyke has been built to surround the island, the purpose of which is to keep the seaweed-eating local sheep off the arable land.

== Prehistory ==
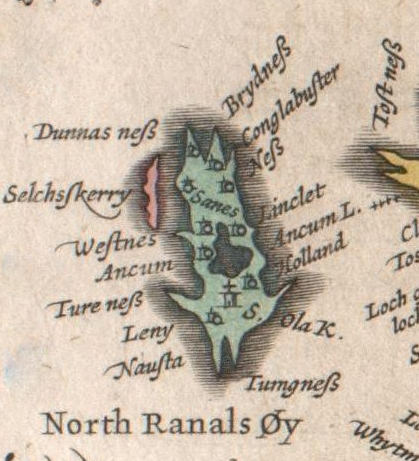
Blaeu's Atlas of Scotland, published 1654

A well-preserved Iron Age broch, known as the Broch of Burrian, is located on the southern tip of the island. Excavations in 1870–71 uncovered a large number of Iron Age and Pictish artefacts, with occupation continuing up to the Norse occupation of the Orkney islands in the 9th century.

== History ==
According to the Orkneyinga saga, Torf-Einarr, the 10th-century Norse Earl of Orkney, killed Hálfdan Longlegs on North Ronaldsay in revenge for Hálfdan and his brother Gudrød Ljome's slaying of Rögnvald Eysteinsson, Torf-Einarr's father. Hálfdan and Gudrød, who were the sons of King Harald Finehair of Norway, had trapped Rögnvald in his house and set it alight. Harald, apparently appalled by his sons' actions, overthrew Gudrød and restored Rögnvald's lands to his son, Thorir Rögnvaldarson, while Hálfdan fled westwards to Orkney and displaced Torf-Einarr. From a base in Caithness, Torf-Einarr resisted Hálfdan's occupation of the islands. After a battle at sea, and a ruthless campaign on land, Torf-Einarr spied Hálfdan hiding on North Ronaldsay. The sagas claim that Hálfdan was captured, and sacrificed to Odin as a blood-eagle.

The Joseph of King's Lynn was wrecked on Bride's Ness beach in April 1586. The crew salvaged the brass guns but they were confiscated by the Earl of Orkney.

The 'New Description' that accompanies Blaeu's maps states that the island is “wide, flat, low and dry, adorned with the church of St Olaf and sharing in the same inconveniences with Sanday, from which it is separated by far the most terrifying sea.” The author of the description was likely Walter Stewart, who was Moderator of the presbytery of Orkney from 1642 to 1643. Although more familiar with the South Isles of the archipelago than the north there is no reason to doubt the accuracy of his statement although no other reference to this dedication to St Olaf on North Ronaldsay seems to exist. Dickins writes that "this is probably the parish church of the island, situated near Holland".

Holland House was built in 1727; the Old Beacon, dating from 1789, was the third lighthouse to be built by Thomas Smith for the Commissioners of the Northern Lights.

=== Overview of population trends ===
Year	1787	1791	1811	1841	1881	1891	1931	1961	1981	1991	2001	2011	2022
Population	384	420	384	481	547	501	298	161	109	92	70	72	59

In September 2026, the first baby was born in North Ronaldsay since a baby was born in August 1992. With the decline of the population, there has been increasingly few children living on North Ronaldsay, with there being no children attending the primary school since 2017. In 2017, there was only one child under 12, a one year old.

== Transport ==
Flights from North Ronaldsay Airport link the island with Kirkwall on the Orkney Mainland, as does a weekly ferry operated by Orkney Ferries. In the summer there are ferries on Tuesdays and Fridays. Flights are subsidized to £36 return, or £21 return for those who stay for at least one night.

== Economy ==
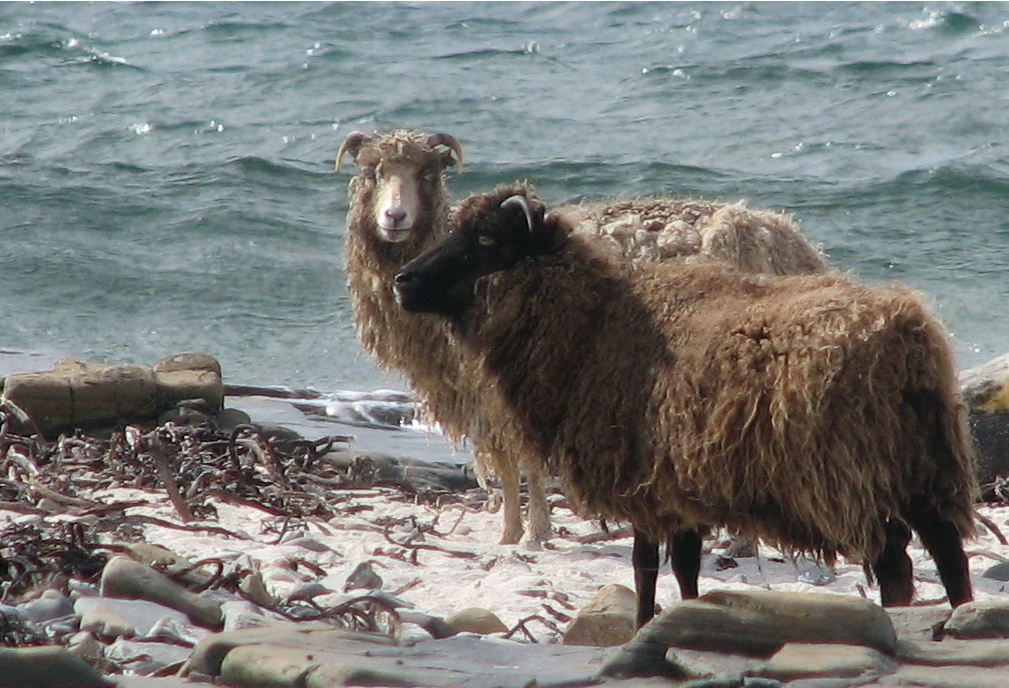
The unusual North Ronaldsay sheep

The main industries on the island are crofting and sheep farming, where North Ronaldsay sheep, a rare breed which feed mostly on seaweed, are mostly farmed collectively. Tourism also plays an important role. The island has a population of 60, roughly half of whom are descended from native islanders, and new islanders who have come to live there. There is great interest in attracting new families with young children in order to keep the school open.

== Wildlife ==
North Ronaldsay was a habitat for the Atlantic walrus through the mid-16th century.

The great auk was a North Atlantic flightless bird about the size of a goose; it became extinct in 1844. North Ronaldsay was a habitat where the great auk was quite abundant. At one Neolithic site, great auk bones make up nearly 14% of bird bones.

The main purpose of the island's bird observatory, established in 1987, is to conduct long-term monitoring of bird populations and migration. North Ronaldsay is well known as one of the best birdwatching sites in the country during the spring and autumn migration periods. The quantity and variety of birds that can be seen at these times is often spectacular.

The island's coast has been designated an Important Bird Area (IBA) by BirdLife International because it supports purple sandpipers and breeding black guillemots.

== Lighthouse ==
Dennis Head Old Beacon

=== Old Beacon ===
Dennis Head, in the northeast of the island, is home to a historic lighthouse known as the Old Beacon. The light was first established in 1789 by Thomas Smith. It was to be the first of many island lighthouses for Smith (he had previously worked on the lights at Kinnaird Head and Mull of Kintyre). Smith received assistance with the North Ronaldsay light from his stepson Robert Stevenson, and from Ezekiel Walker.

In 1809, with the construction of other nearby lighthouses, it was decided that the North Ronaldsay light was no longer required, and it was extinguished. The round stone tower was retained as a sea-mark, however, and the original beacon chamber at the top replaced by a vaulted roof, capped by a remarkable ball finial. The stone spiral staircase which once led to the beacon was demolished. The original keepers' houses, roofless but largely complete, survive below the tower. In 2006, it was one of the neglected buildings selected for the TV series Restoration.

=== Modern lighthouse ===
A new lighthouse was built nearby just 43 years later in 1852. The modern lighthouse lies at the north of the island at Point of Sinsoss, and boasts Britain's tallest land-based lighthouse tower. The old fog siren with notable red trumpet was replaced by an electric diaphragm-type horn. That horn was discontinued in favour of a Tyfon horn consisting of 8 mini-trumpets installed on the building that once housed the fog siren. The Tyfon horn gives three blasts every 60 seconds. The electric beeper horn now lies flat on the ground next to the fog signal building. The fog signal is still in service today.

== Education ==
The community has a single school, North Ronaldsay Primary School. It had a single student until July 2017, when its sole student graduated. Various organizations use the school building.

== See also ==
- List of islands of Scotland
