= Thomas Smith (engineer) =

Scottish businessman and early lighthouse engineer (1752–1815)

Lighthouses constructed by Thomas Smith

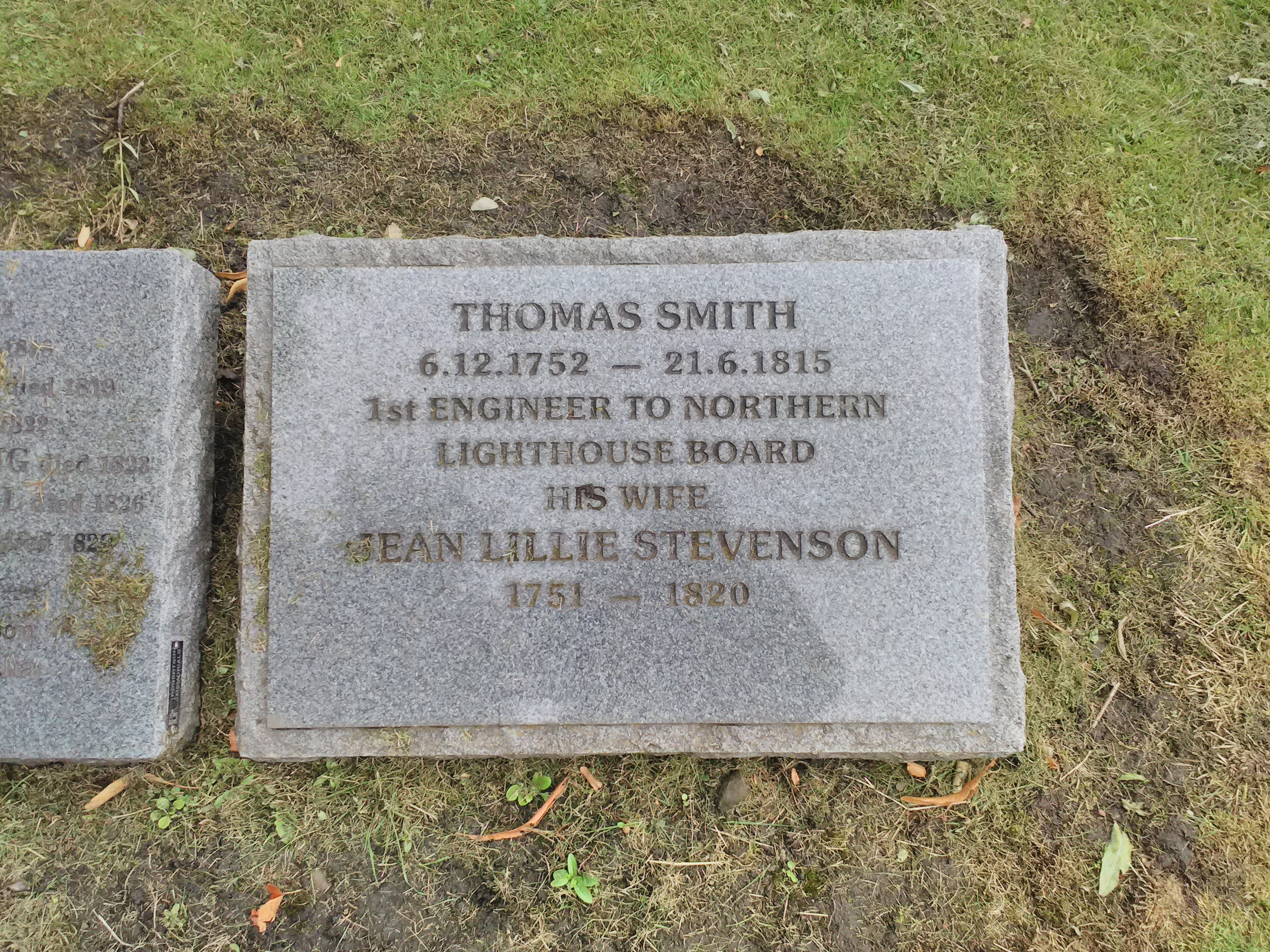
The grave of Thomas Smith, Old Calton Cemetery, Edinburgh

Thomas Smith (6 December 1752 – 21 June 1815) was a Scottish businessman and early lighthouse engineer. He was appointed as the first Chief Engineer to the Northern Lighthouse Board in 1786.

== Early life ==
Smith was born in Broughty Ferry near Dundee on 6 December 1752. His father, a skipper, drowned in Dundee harbour while Thomas was still young. As a result, his mother encouraged him towards a career onshore, leading him initially into ironmongery. While his widowed mother remained in Broughty Ferry, Smith went on to establish himself in Edinburgh.

== Professional career ==
In Edinburgh Smith founded and appears to have been the sole proprietor of a successful business in lamps and oils called the Greenside Company's Works. Smith won a contract to provide improved street lighting for Edinburgh's burgeoning New Town.

The oil lamps he provided featured parabolic reflectors made from burnished copper, which concentrated the light and enhanced its brightness. Manufacturing such reflectors within tight tolerances was not straightforward, but the innovations devised by Smith gave his lamps quadruple the power of standard oil-lit lamps without any kind of reflector.

The success of Smith's work in street lighting provided him with the connections and qualifications which resulted in his appointment as Chief Engineer to the newly formed Northern Lighthouse Trust (now Northern Lighthouse Board) in 1786. He was commissioned to build the first four modern lighthouses and promptly dispatched south to pick-up technical expertise from an English lighthouse builder (possibly John Smeaton, who built the pioneering third Eddystone Lighthouse in the 1750s, or perhaps Ezekiel Walker or William Hutchinson).

Upon his return Smith set about the construction of the four new lighthouses at Kinnaird Head, Mull of Kintyre, Eilean Glas and North Ronaldsay. As well as the design and construction, Smith had to overcome significant financial, logistical and supply-chain challenges resulting from the remote locations of the projects. Nonetheless, all four lighthouses were successfully constructed.

Smith quickly adopted the newly invented Argand lamp, which with its circular wick and glass chimney gave a much brighter light than traditional wick lamps. Most significantly, he combined this with his parabolic reflectors resulting in a combination which came to be known as the catoptric system and set the standard for lighthouse illumination at that time.

The first of his lighthouses—Kinnaird Head (1787)—had 17 whale-oil lamps backed by parabolic reflectors and was said to be the most powerful light of its day with a reported range of 12 to 14 miles (10 to 12 mmi; 19 to 23 km). Smith continued to experiment and improve on his designs over the coming years and it was one of his last designs, Start Point, Sanday (1806), which incorporated a revolving light which was to become universal.

Smith stepped down from his role with the Northern Lighthouse Board in 1808 and was succeeded by his stepson Robert Stevenson. However, he remained active in his private business.

== Family life ==
In 1792—five years after his appointment to the Northern Lighthouse Board—Smith married his third wife, Jean Lillie Stevenson (1751–1820).

Prior to this, Smith had been twice widowed. He had five children by his first wife, though only a daughter (Jane) and son (James) survived infancy. He had one further daughter (Mary-Anne), by his second wife.

Jean Lillie Stevenson was herself a widow, with a young son called Robert Stevenson. Her first husband was Alan Stevenson, a partner in a West Indies sugar trading house in Glasgow who died of epidemic fever on the island of St. Christopher in the West Indies in 1774 leaving Jean Lillie in precarious financial circumstances.

The new family initially lived at 1 Blair Street off the Royal Mile in Edinburgh's Old Town, before moving to the then newly built 2 Baxter's Place at the head of Leith Walk in 1798/9.

The relationship between Thomas Smith and his step-son Robert Stevenson proved to be close and admiring. Though Stevenson's mother had intended him for a career in the ministry, he instead became a keen assistant to his step-father's works and was formally apprenticed to Smith in 1791. This relationship was further cemented by an unusual circumstance: in 1799 Stevenson married his then 20-year-old step-sister Jane. The following year, Stevenson became a full partner in Smith's firm and eventually succeeded him as Chief Engineer to the Northern Lighthouse Board in 1808, initiating a dynasty of Stevenson's as lighthouse builders.

Little is known about Thomas Smith's own son James except that he left home to found his own ironmongery business, but whether this was due to some rift with his father is unknown. His daughter Janet was mother to the physicist William Swan.

Smith died at home in 2 Baxter's Place in on 21 June 1815, aged 62. He is buried in the north-east section of Old Calton Burial Ground. Upon his death, it was Robert Stevenson who inherited the house.

== Lighthouses of Thomas Smith ==
- Kinnaird Head (1787)
- Mull of Kintyre (1788)
- Dennis Head Old Beacon, North Ronaldsay (1789)
- Eilean Glas, Scalpay, Harris (1789)
- Pladda, off the Isle of Arran (1790)
- Little Cumbrae (1793)
- Muckle Skerry (1794)
- Cloch, Gourock (1797)
- Inchkeith, Firth of Forth (1804)
- Start Point, Sanday (1806)
