= Stargazing: Memoirs of a Young Lighthouse Keeper =

2003 autobiography by Peter Hill

- Author: Peter Hill
- Language: English
- Genre: Memoir
- Publisher: Canongate Books
- Publication date: 2003
- Publication place: United Kingdom
- Media type: Book
- Pages: 275 (2003 edition)
- ISBN: 1841954993

Stargazing: Memoirs of a Young Lighthouse Keeper is a autobiographical book by Peter Hill published in 2003 by Canongate Books. In January 2004, it was BBC Radio 4's Book of the Week read by David Tennant, and received the Saltire Society's First Book of the Year Award in December that year.

The book is a memoir about Hill's time in the early 1970s as a young lighthouse keeper on the remote Scottish coast at the Pladda Lighthouse, Ailsa Craig Lighthouse, and the Hyskeir Lighthouse.
