= Islands of Britain =

Islands of Britain may refer to:

- British Isles, the archipelago off north-western Europe
- British Islands, a term referring collectively to the United Kingdom, along with a group of territories with constitutional links to the country
- List of islands of the British Isles
- List of islands of the United Kingdom
- Islands of Britain (TV series)

== See also ==
- British Isles naming dispute
- Terminology of the British Isles
