= Round Island Light, Isles of Scilly =

Lighthouse in the Isles of Scilly

Round Island Lighthouse
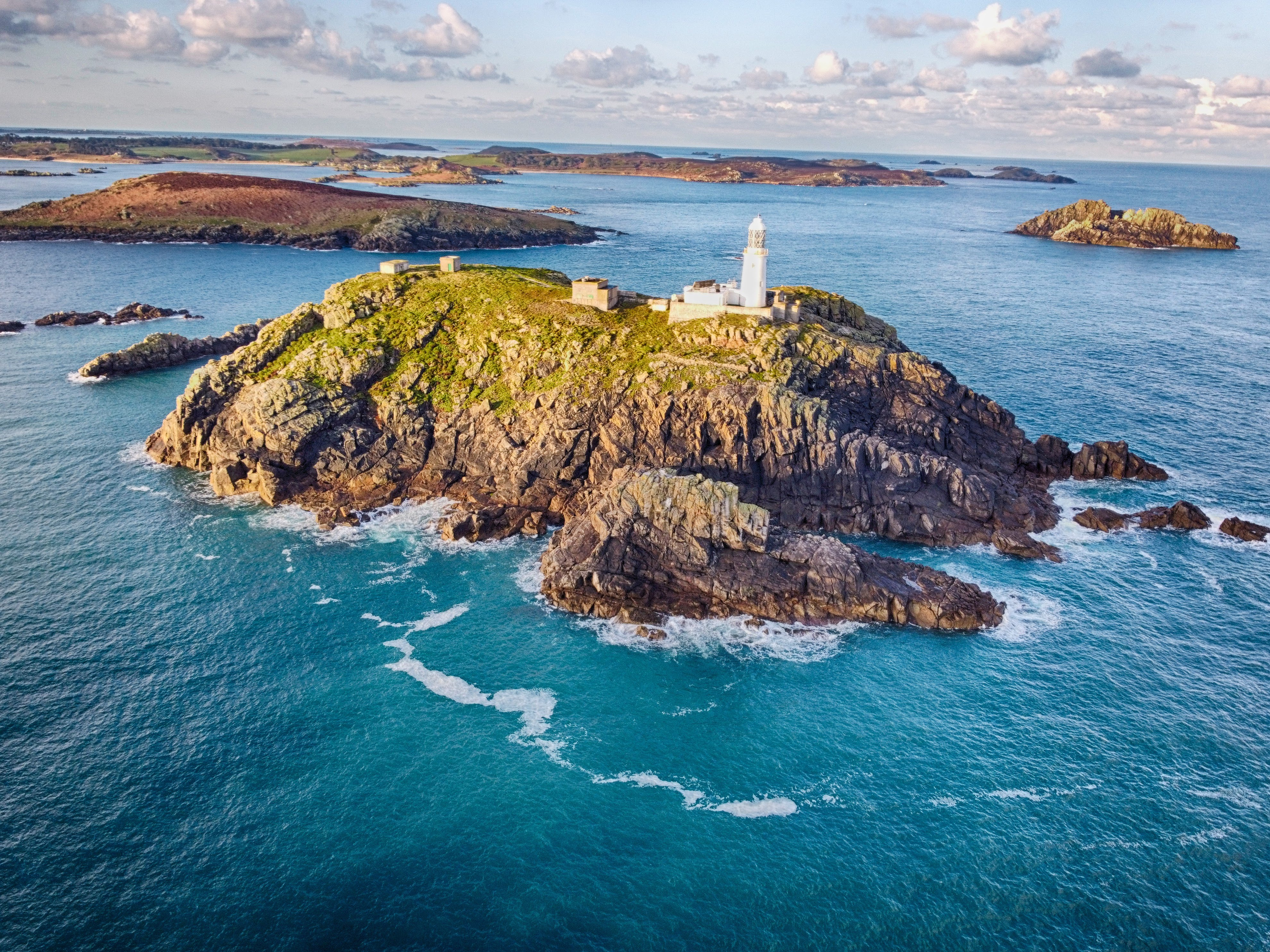
- Location: Round Island; Isles of Scilly; England
- OS grid: SV9018617708
- Coordinates: 49.979033°N 6.323108°W

Tower
- Constructed: 1887
- Construction: granite tower
- Automated: 1987
- Height: 19 metres (62 ft)
- Shape: cylindrical tower with balcony and lantern
- Markings: white tower and lantern
- Operator: Trinity House
- Heritage: Grade II listed building
- Fog signal: 4 blasts every 60s.

Light
- Focal height: 55 metres (180 ft)
- Lens: biform hyperradial optic (original), 360mm revolving optic (current)
- Light source: LED lamp
- Intensity: 42,945 candela
- Range: 18 nautical miles (33 km; 21 mi)
- Characteristic: Fl W 10s.

Round Island Lighthouse (Cornish: Golowji an Voth "the hump lighthouse"), in the Isles of Scilly was designed by William Tregarthen Douglass for Trinity House and completed in 1887. At the time of building it was one of three lights in the Isles of Scilly, the others being the Bishop Rock and St Agnes lighthouse. The light was modernised in 1966, automated in 1987 and the island designated as a Site of Special Scientific Interest (SSSI) in 1995. It is now managed by the Isles of Scilly Wildlife Trust, and except for the maintenance of the Grade II listed lighthouse, landing is not allowed.

== History ==
A cairn or burial chamber was destroyed when the lighthouse was built. Cairns on the Isles of Scilly date back to the Bronze Age and at that time Round Island was probably a peninsula on the northern shore of the main island in the Isles of Scilly.

The granite, ashlar, 19 metres (62 ft) tall tower was designed by William Tregarthen Douglass, chief engineer for the Commissioners of Irish Lights, and is built on a 35 metres (115 ft) tall mass of Hercynian granite. At the time of building the only access was up a flight of steps cut out of the rock on the south side of the island. Supplies were taken up the rock face by an aerial hoist: a 400 ft (120 m) wire rope strung between the island and an adjacent islet was rigged with a traveller, which enabled goods to be winched up from delivery boats 150 ft (46 m) below. Within the walls of the lighthouse the keepers tended a small vegetable garden, for which the soil was transported to the island.

The light was first lit on 12 November 1887 and has a focal plane of 180 feet. It originally had an enormous biform hyperradial optic 4.6 metres (15 ft) high and weighing more than 8 tons. It was built by Chance Brothers & Co of Birmingham and, said at the time, to be ″ .... in relation both to size and character .... the most remarkable works of their kind hitherto achieved.″ A similar optic had been installed in the nearby Bishop Rock Lighthouse the previous year. In order to differentiate the Round Island light from Bishop's Rock it was made to show a single red flash every 30 seconds (whereas Bishop's Rock gave a double white flash). At the centre of the optic was a pair of ten-wick Douglass oil burners (larger than the eight-wick burners installed at Bishop Rock); these unusually large lamps helped compensate for the reduced intensity caused by the light passing through red-tinted glass. Mineral oil for the lamps was stored in tanks, located at the south end of the island alongside the aerial host. The optic was turned by a small air engine placed in the pedestal; compressed air was provided from a set of compressors and tanks located in a separate engine house (a detached building to the south of the tower), powered by a pair of Davey 'Safety' Engines.

In 1912 the lighthouse was provided with a fog siren, sounded through a pair of large red-painted Rayleigh Trumpets mounted on the roof of a fog horn house, adjacent to the lighthouse itself on the north side. It sounded four blasts every two minutes. The engine house was upgraded and equipped with a pair of 22 hp Hornsby oil engines which drove the compressor. These remained in service until the late 1960s, when they were replaced with diesel engines.

Britain's first wireless beacon for navigation, designed for Trinity House by the Marconi Company, was established at Round Island Lighthouse in 1927, (following the trial run of an experimental system there two years earlier). The installation consisted of a 'multi-wire inverted L type aerial' strung between the lighthouse gallery and a 60-foot (18 m) steel lattice tower. It automatically transmitted a repeated cycle, including the station's unique call sign ('GGG' in Morse code), for nine minutes every half hour (or continuously in foggy weather). Similar systems were subsequently installed at lighthouses and other locations around the coast of Britain. Later, in 1961, a more powerful radio beacon set was installed on the island.

In 1966 the light was electrified. The old hyperradial optic was replaced by a flat vertical panel with rows of sealed beam lamps, each covered by a red shade, which was mounted on an AGA revolving gearless pedestal. A helicopter pad was built on the rock alongside the lighthouse in 1969, but boat deliveries also continued; the aerial hoist was upgraded in 1972. The optic was replaced again in 1987 when the light was automated and its colour changed from red to white, emitting one white flash every ten seconds; it had an intensity of 340,000 candela and a range of 24 nautical miles (44 km; 28 mi). Prior to automation, the siren was replaced with an electric nautophone signal.

In 2002-3 the lighthouse was converted to solar power, with photovoltaic cells replacing the erstwhile constantly running diesel alternator sets as the power source for the light and fog signal. The lamp was upgraded to an LED in 2025. The lighthouse continues to display one white flash every ten seconds; the 360 millimetres (14 in) revolving drum optic has an intensity of 42,945 candela and a range of 18 nautical miles (33 km; 21 mi). The fog signal sounds four blasts every minute.

== Wildlife and ecology ==
Round Island was designated a Site of Special Scientific Interest in 1995 as part of the Pentle Bay, Merrick and Round Islands SSSI. The island is important for its breeding seabirds, especially the European storm–petrel (Hydrobates pelagicus). Breeding storm–petrels were unrecorded on Round Island for many years, until one of the lighthouse keepers, mystified by the nightly appearance of black feathers in the living quarters, decided to keep some. When the identity of the bird was discovered, the cat was banished. The Seabird 2000 survey counted 183 occupied nests and a follow–up survey in 2006 found 251 occupied nests on the island; the second highest total in the Isles of Scilly. The seabird survey in 2000 also recorded 34 occupied nests of Manx shearwater (Puffinus puffinus).

Puffins (Fratercula arctica) were first recorded as breeding on Round Island in 1850 by Issac North and during the building of the lighthouse it was said that ″They (puffins) were extremely tame and used to walk in and out of the kitchen of the workmen who built the tower. This tameness, and the edibility of their eggs, proved their undoing, for none survive now″.

Brown rats (Rattus norvegicus) were discovered on the island in January 2022 and volunteers landed on the island thirteen times to set up bait stations, which removed the rats before the return of Manx shearwater and European storm petrel in April. If the rats had not been removed they would have eaten the chicks.

On the last couple of trips to remove the rats, teeth marks of the Scilly shrew (Crocidura suaveolens) were found on non-toxic chocolate wax. With the removal of rats the population should also recover.

Permission is needed from Trinity House to land on the island and only two botanists are known to have visited. The first, J. E. Lousley, in 1957, only recorded the invasive Hottentot fig (Carpobrotus edulis). Thirty years later, in 1987, Rosemary Parslow found much of the ground between the buildings and the cliff edge was covered in a carpet of purple dewplant (Disphyma crassifolium) and Hottentot fig. She also recorded a small number of the expected coastal species. They were sea spleenwort (Asplenium marinum), bird's–foot trefoil (Lotus corniculatus), spear–leaved orache (Atriplex prostrata), sea beet (Beta vulgaris subsp. maritima), rock sea spurrey (Spergularia rupicola), thrift (Armeria maritima) and tree mallow (Lavatera arborea).

Gusts of winds can be ferocious such as in 1954 when there was continuous gales from 29 November to 16 December. Wind velocities of 177 km/h (110 mph) were recorded at the Bishop Rock where seas raced past the window, and on Round Island the wind gauge was destroyed at 177 km/h.

== Gallery ==
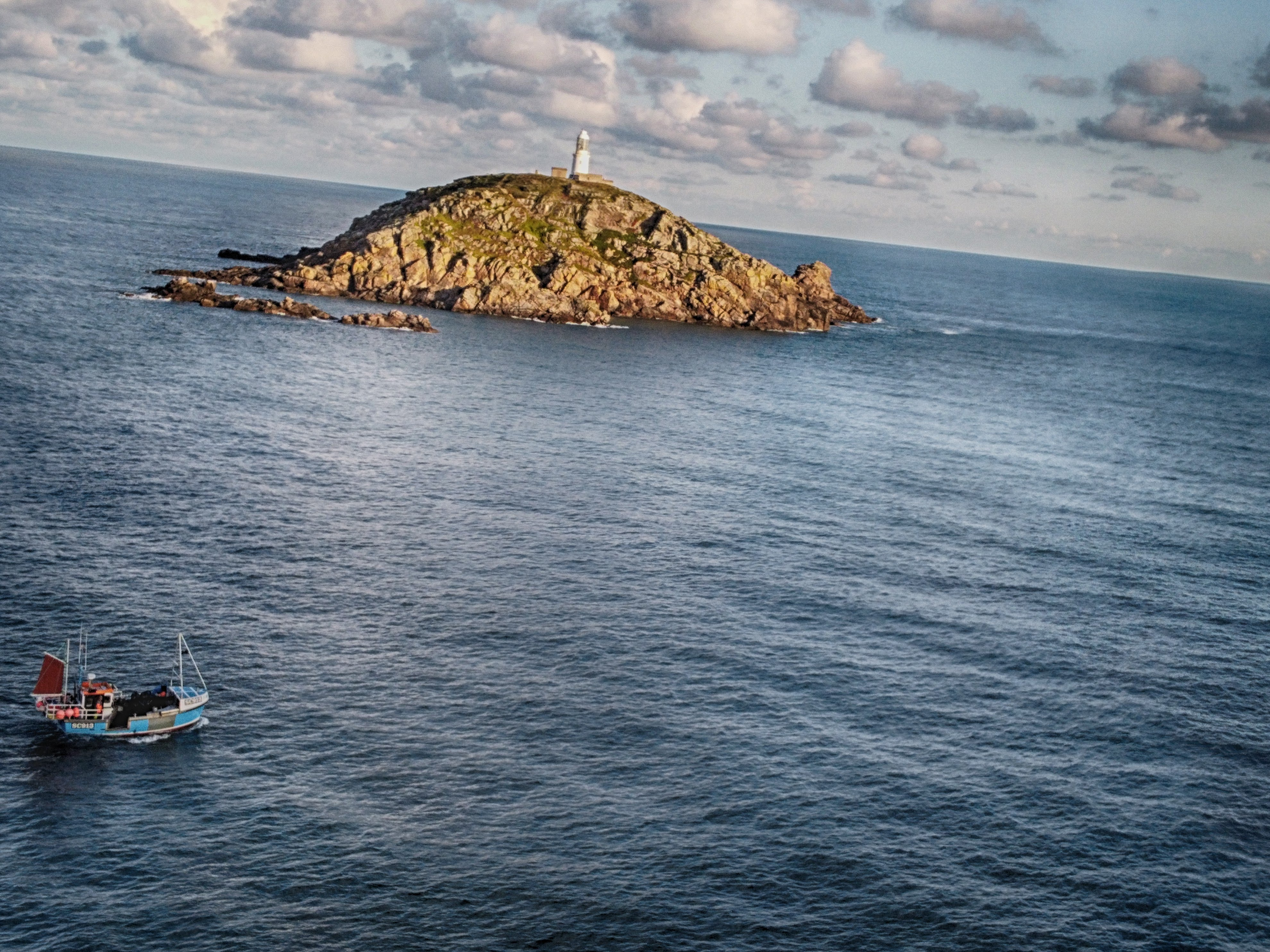

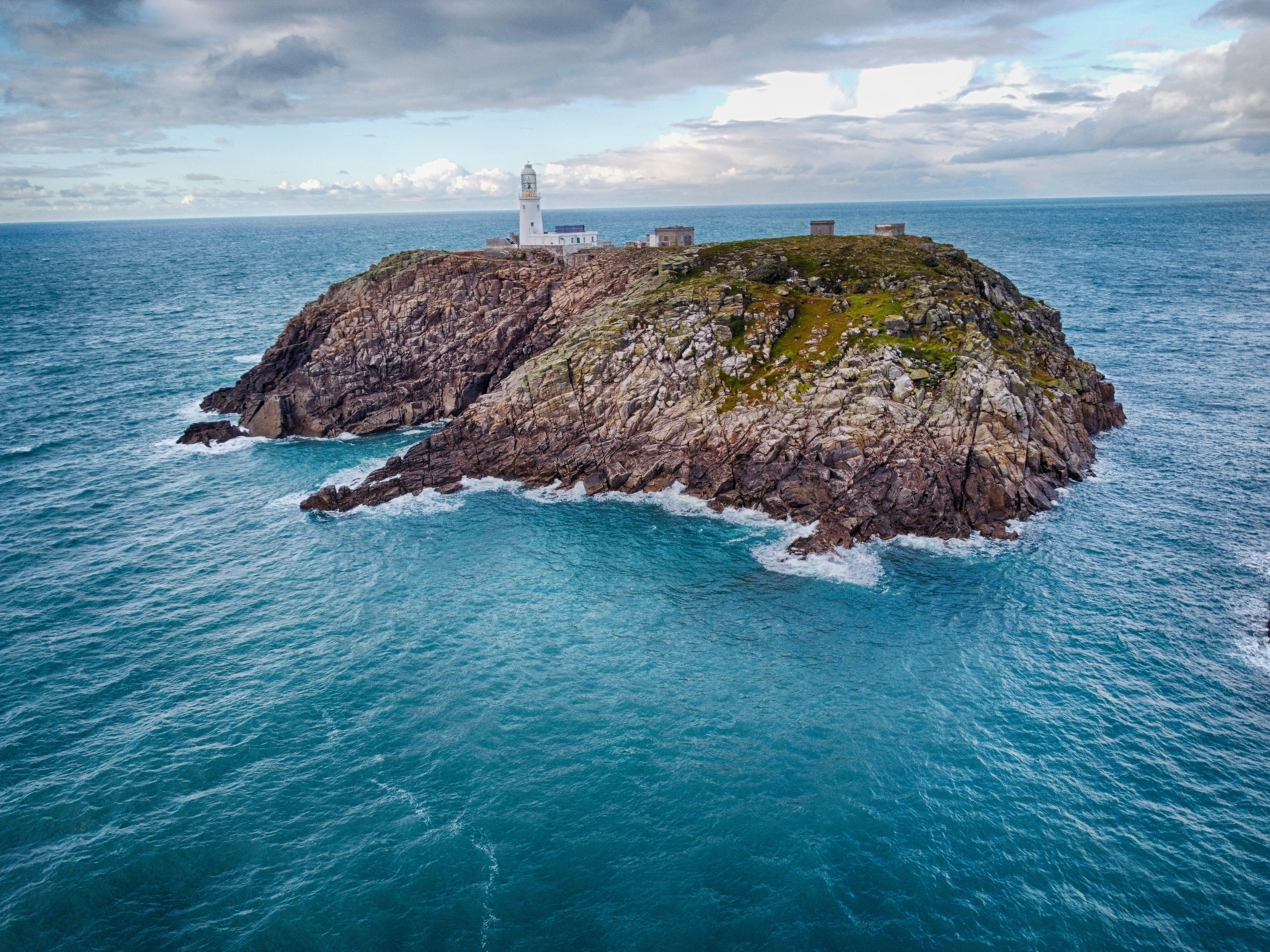

== See also ==
- Listed buildings in Tresco, Isles of Scilly
- List of shipwrecks of the Isles of Scilly
