= Secret Life of (2013 TV programme) =

- Genre: Factual
- Voices of: Martin Clunes
- Country of origin: United Kingdom
- Original language: English
- No. of episodes: 6

Production
- Running time: 60 minutes (inc. adverts)

Original release
- Network: ITV
- Release: 31 January 2013 – 21 February 2017

Secret Life of... is a British factual documentary show, which follows the lives of each show's subject, finding out more about what life is like for that being. Episodes are narrated by Martin Clunes.

== Episodes ==
#	Date Aired	Title	Note(s)
1	31 January 2013	Secret Life of Dogs	
2	2 June 2014	Secret Life of Cats	
3	3 June 2014	Secret Life of Babies	
4	15 July 2015	Secret Life of Twins	
5	7 February 2017	Secret Life of Dogs	
6	14 February 2017	Secret Life of Dogs	
7	21 February 2017	Secret Life of Dogs	
