= William Douglass (engineer) =

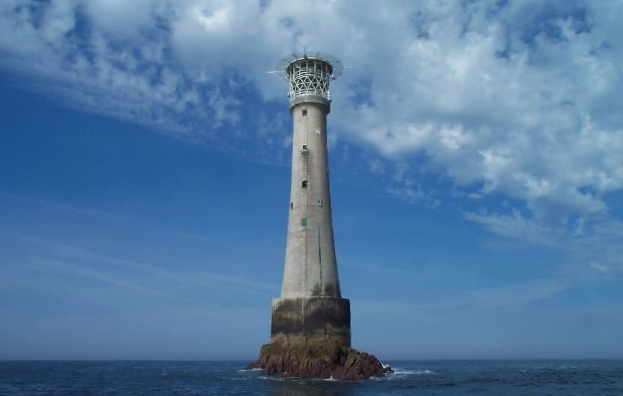
Bishop Rock Lighthouse

William Tregarthen Douglass (1857–1913) was an engineer, from a lighthouse engineering family. He was a consulting engineer for lighthouse construction for several governments around the world. His father was Sir James Nicholas Douglass, and his uncle William and his grandfather Nicholas were also famous in lighthouse construction.

== Personal life ==
Douglas married Ada James of Plymouth at Charles Church, Plymouth on 27 December 1881.

== Career ==
William T Douglass was Assistant Engineer to Thomas Edmond in the construction of the fourth Eddystone Lighthouse and then superintendent of work after Edmond was called to other work. Douglass supervised the whole work of fitting up the internal arrangements of the new Eddystone Lighthouse, as well as dismantling and removing the upper portion of Smeaton's Tower, leaving the foundation intact.

One of William Douglass's most impressive achievements was his supervision of the renovation and reinforcement of the Bishop Rock Lighthouse.

Consulting engineer to the Governments of Western Australia, New South Wales, and Victoria. Inspecting engineer to the RNLI. In 1899 he was selected by the Secretary of State for India to inspect and report on the whole of the lighthouses of India and Burma.

Member of the Institution of Civil Engineers, and a Fellow of King's College, London. He died on 10 August 1913 following a boating accident at Dartmouth.

== Works ==
- Bishop Rock Lighthouse 1881–1887
- Round Island Light, Isles of Scilly 1887–1888
- Dondra Head Lighthouse 1889–1890
- Cape Leeuwin Lighthouse 1896
