= Martin Clunes: Islands of Australia =

- Also known as: Islands of Oz
- Directed by: Ian Leese
- Presented by: Martin Clunes
- Country of origin: Australia
- Original language: English
- No. of seasons: 1
- No. of episodes: 3

Production
- Executive producers: Julia Redwood; Ed Punchard; Bill Jones; Philippa Braithwaite
- Running time: 60 minutes (inc. adverts)
- Production company: Prospero Productions

Original release
- Network: Seven Network
- Release: 7 October 2016 – present

Related
- Islands of Britain

Martin Clunes: Islands of Australia (also known as Islands of Oz) is a three-part Australian documentary television series produced by Prospero Productions for the Seven Network. The series is hosted by Martin Clunes and has Clunes exploring various islands off the Australian mainland.

== Background ==
The program received funding from Screen Australia in December 2013. The series is produced by Prospero Productions and Buffalo Pictures, and produced by Julia Redwood, Ed Punchard, Bill Jones and Philippa Braithwaite. The series is an adaptation of Islands of Britain, also starring Clunes and produced by Buffalo Pictures.

Filming began in 2016.

== Broadcast ==
The series debuted on the Seven Network on 7 October 2016.

== DVD ==
In the UK the DVD of the series was released in March 2017

== Episodes ==
No. in season	Title	Original release date	Australian viewers
1	Episode 1	7 October 2016	722,000
Martin visits Lord Howe Island, Norfolk Island, Restoration Island and Torres Strait Islands.
2	Episode 2	14 October 2016	749,000
Martin visits the Muiron Islands, Tiwi Islands, Abrolhos Islands and Rottnest Island.
3	Episode 3	21 October 2016	634,000
Martin visits Phillip Island, King Island and Maria Island.
