= Outback Truckers =

Australian television series

- Genre: Factual television
- Opening theme: Bow River by Cold Chisel (season 4 to season 9)
- Country of origin: Australia
- Original language: English
- No. of seasons: 11
- No. of episodes: 107

Production
- Producer: Prospero Productions
- Running time: 44 minutes

Original release
- Network: 7mate
- Release: 18 October 2012 – present

Related
- Ice Road Truckers

Outback Truckers is an Australian factual television series which looks at the Australian road-transport industry. It focuses on selected drivers and interesting personalities and shows the problems tackled by some sectors. The show is filmed mostly across Australia, but also takes occasional detours in New Zealand (seasons 3–5) and Weno, Micronesia (season 4). It originally screened on the Seven Network in 2012 and currently airs on 7mate. It has aired around the world on networks such as Quest TV (UK) and Discovery Europe. The series currently has eleven seasons.

== Cast ==
- Adrian Bennett - TAS (Season 7)
- Amanda Kendall – Kendall Trucking & Co, Katanning, WA, oversize pilot (Season 2–5)
- Ash Bryant - (Season 7)
- Athol Martin - Mactrans Heavy Haulage, WA | MACK (Season 8)
- Anthony Haigh – Murranji Water Drilling (Season 6, 7)
- Anthony 'Hayesy' Hayes – Murranji Water Drilling (Season 6, 7)
- Ashleigh Mackay – Mackay & Sons House Removals & Demolition, Narangba, QLD (Season 6-7)
- Belinda Riehl - Cattle trucking | Kenworth (Season 3, Episode 10)
- Bella - Steve Grahame's dog
- Bob Fraser (Season 3)
- Boe Vella - Fred NT Group, Darwin, NT (Season 9)
- Brad Duckworth – Black Cat Civil Contractors, Nambour, QLD (Season 5)
- Brett Robin - Logging trucker (Season 2)
- Brian Andersson - Mactrans Heavy Haulage, (Season 8)
- Carl Andrews (Season 3)
- Chaz Butt (Season 8)
- Chris Ferris (Season 3)
- Chris Parnell – Non-trucking oversize steerer and rearguard guide, Rex J Andrews Pty Ltd., Windfarm transporter, Newcastle, NSW (Season 4–6)
- Christian Reynolds (Season 2)
- Clare Bolitho (Season 1–2)
- Corey Chapman (Season 2)
- Craig Oldham (Season 7)
- Damo Callan (Season 1)
- Danyelle Haigh – Murranji Water Drilling (Season 6, 7)
- Darrell Wright (Season 3)
- Darren 'Woody' Bryant (Season 4–7)
- Darryl Armfield (Season 7)
- Dave "Macka" McCready (Season 2–3)
- Dave Rohrlach (Season 2)
- David Hornick - Cattle trucker (Season 8)
- Deb Drew – Ex-model turned trucker (Season 1)
- Dion Fisher (Season 2)
- Dougal Brett (Season 1)
- Drew Norman (Season 9)
- Emily Brett (Season 1)
- Ewan Stephens (Season 2–3)
- Glen Waters (Season 2)
- Glenn "Yogi" Kendall - Kendall Trucking, Katanning, WA (Season 2–10)
- Gordo Evans (Season 1–2)
- Graham Cockerell – Need for Feed Disaster Relief, Beaconsfield Upper, Victoria (Season 2)
- Greg Wise (Season 3)
- Heather Jones (Season 2)
- Jack Macrae - Mackay & Sons House Removals & Demolition | Mack (Season 10)
- Jacob Marshall (Season 8)
- Jared Baldwin (Season 3)
- Jason Ackeroyd (Season 3)
- Jeff "Bluezy" Barrow (Season 2)
- Jeff Elliot - TAS (Season 5)
- Jeff Fulwood - NT (Season 9)
- Joanna Atkins – North Kimberley Transport, Kununurra, WA (Season 5–7)
- Joel Snell (Season 10)
- Joey Granich (Season 2)
- John Harrison (Season 7)
- Jonathan Rayner (Season 3)
- Josh Beattie – MB Logistics, Adelaide, SA, Industrial Oil and Gas piping (Season 5)
- Justin Harrison – KAC Enterprise Pty Ltd, Bundaberg, QLD (Season 7)
- Karen Elliot - SA (Season 9)
- Katie Howell (Season 2)
- Kaye Ferris (Season 3)
- Kylie Hornick - Cattle trucker (Season 8)
- Larry Brewer – North West Express Mobile Butcher (Season 3, 7)
- Laura Elworthy NSW -
- Leanne Brewer – North West Express Mobile Butcher (Season 3, 7)
- Luke Gilroy -
- Luke Hewitt – Narrator (Season 1–8)
- Mark Bolitho (Season 1–2)
- Mark Cromwell – RJE Global Pty Ltd, Adelaide, SA, Mega-sized trucker (Season 2–5)
- Mark King (Season 1)
- Mark Pett (Season 8-9)
- Mark Sciberras – Windfarm transporter, Rex J Andrews Pty Ltd., Newcastle, NSW (Season 4–6)
- Matt Adams (Season 3)
- Matt Riches (Season 1–2)
- Mel Michelsen (Kenworth Truck, Season 10)
- Mick King - NSW (Season 5–6, 9) moves a 15 week Kiwi born giraffe to its new home in Australia
- Mike Elliot (Season 10)
- Mike Hoath – RJE Global Pty Ltd, Adelaide, SA
- Mike Partridge (Season 8)
- Mish Aladin (Season 9)
- Neil Bennett - TAS (Season 7)
- Nick Atkins – North Kimberley Transport, Kununurra, WA (Season 5–7)
- Nigel McGee - Mackay & Sons House Removals & Demolition (Season 10)
- Noelene Turner (Season 2)
- Paul 'Sludge' Andrews – Paul Andrews Transport, Perth, WA, 'The Phantom' (Season 3–10)
- Paul 'Blinky' Cunningham – Rex J Andrews Pty Ltd., Windfarm transporter, Newcastle, NSW (Season 4–6)
- Peter "Turbo" Teatoff (Season 2–4)
- Ray Kennedy (Season 7)
- Ricki Sutcliffe - TAS (Season 7-8)
- Robbie Mackay – Mackay & Sons House Removals & Demolition, Narangba, Queensland, Australia (Season 5–8)
- Robbie Bush - RMB & Sons Trucking, Allstree VIC | Kenworth (Season 10)
- Rosco Haining (Season 3)
- Ross Carrigy (Season 7)
- Russell McDonough - Alice Springs Metal Recyclers (Season 2–6) found guilty on four charges, including assault in the Supreme Court and sentenced to 3 years gaol, suspended after 3 months.
- Scott Conohan - (Season 8)
- Shane Burgess – Mackay & Sons House Removals & Demolition, Narangba, QLD, Australia (Season 5–8)
- Sharon Collins (Season 2–3, 8)
- Shui Evans (Season 1–2)
- Simon Page (Season 3)
- Sonya Wise (Season 3)
- Steve Grahame – Perth, WA | Kenworth (Seasons 1–10)
- Steve Hughes (Season 1)
- Sy Howells (Season 7)
- Terry Snell (Season 10)
- Troy Coombe (Season 7) transports two ostriches
- Wayne Haigh, Murranji Water Drilling
- Wendy Andrews – Paul Andrews Transport, Perth, WA, fuel-tanker (Season 3–10)
- Will Nuttal
- Woody Bryant

== Relation to other series ==
In season 5, government has released land to Coober Pedy (South Australia) for the mining of opals in 2017, and Mark Cromwell was seen sending mining machinery to the mines. In 2018, it spawned the spinoff series: Outback Opal Hunters.

== Reception ==
Outback Truckers was favourably reviewed by the press. Melinda Houston from The Sydney Morning Herald's 'Critics Choice' noted that "they're great stories well told from a part of the country and a way of life most of us will never otherwise experience". It was also praised in The West Australian for its various close ties with Western Australia. News Limited's 'Switch On' gave it a 4/5 rating, one of the week's highest scores.

== International broadcasting ==
The following table lists the countries in which Outback Truckers airs outside Australia.

Country	Network(s)/station(s)
Australia (origin)	7mate
United Kingdom	Quest, 5Action
New Zealand	TVNZ 1, TVNZ On Demand
Netherlands	Discovery Channel
Norway	Discovery Channel
Poland	Discovery Channel
Czech Republic	Discovery Channel
Slovakia	Discovery Channel
Lithuania	Discovery Channel
Bulgaria	Viasat Explore
Germany	DMAX (TV channel)
Ireland	Discovery Channel
Italy	DMAX
Spain	DMAX
France	RMC Découverte
United States	Netflix (removed from listing), Prime Video

== Episodes ==
=== Series overview ===
Season	Episodes	Originally aired		DVD release date	DVD features
Season	Episodes	Season premiere	Season finale	Region 4	Note
1	5	18 October 2012	17 November 2012	13 August 2014	2 Discs; Running time: 260 minutes
2	13	6 February 2014	30 June 2014	13 August 2014	4 Discs; Running time: 572 minutes
3	13	13 March 2015	15 May 2015	12 August 2015	4 Discs; Running time: 580 minutes
4	13	6 May 2016	26 July 2016	17 August 2016	4 Discs; Running time: 576 minutes
5	13	16 May 2017	8 August 2017	23 August 2017	4 Discs; Running time: 572 minutes
6	13	8 May 2018	31 July 2018	29 August 2018	4 Discs; Running time: 400 minutes
7	13	28 May 2019	20 August 2019	16 October 2019	3 Discs; Running time: 573 minutes
8	13	5 May 2020	28. July 2020		
9	13	4 May 2021	20 July 2021		
10	13	27 Aug 2024			

=== Series 1 (2012) ===
No. overall	No. in season	Title	Original release date
1	1	"Episode 1"	18 October 2012
Richo owns a fleet of monster trucks and all the problems that go with them. He's got to get his convoy half way across the Australian continent to the middle of the desert. Clare and Mark are a trucking couple who complete one of the longest cross country supply runs in the world. Every six weeks they drive as far as the circumference of the Earth. The distance they can handle, crazy motorists drive them mad and driving level crossings under lights and 10 km above the speed limit. Gordon and Shui run road-trains to mining outposts in Australia's remote north. Working around the clock, beating fire and floods. Teeming summer rain is already playing havoc with the schedule of long distance truckie, Mark Bolitho, as he prepares for a marathon five-day trek across the Australian continent. It's been a good run so far but there are signs of trouble up ahead. A severe thunderstorm with hail, gale force winds and flash flooding hits the truck. On the edge of the Central Australian desert, Richo's convoy prepare to hit the dirt roads. It's going to be a tough ride for his most trusted driver, "Yeti". Up north on the coast road, Shui's losing patience with a slower road train but overtaking in these elongated rigs is a tricky operation. And it's not helped by two fellow truckies tying up the CB radio. For Richo's convoy, rains have closed several roads. Yeti's truck is in the lead but it's been badly shaken up. Clare and Mark are about to hit the endless straight of the Nullarbor Plain. No corners to worry about, just cars that don't understand trucks. Richo decides he'll stay at the small town of Warburton with part of his convoy and send two trucks of perishable goods to see if they can get through. It's not long before conditions start to deteriorate. Patches of water suddenly become lakes of unknown depth. He's only 21 but Yeti is already a veteran of the deepwater crossing. The trucks make it through, but they've taken a hammering. Time to give the boss back at Warburton some more bad news. Yeti will have to sit tight, camp out while Richo organises a replacement truck. The breakdown has already cost them precious time and with freezers packed with cold goods, sitting around in 40 degree heat isn't an option. Yeti's makes it to his destination. The unload is going smoothly until the shopkeeper notices something isn't right – the truck's freezers have not been working. Two hundred kilometres down the road, melting ice cream is the last of Richo's problems. He has a $3000 a day crane parked and idle. He needs to get it back to its owner before it sends him broke.
2	2	"Episode 2"	27 October 2012
In Perth lone trucking operator Steve Grahame is preparing for an epic journey. A 3000-kilometre trek to the top of Western Australia. Steve's a veteran driver with a reputation for getting trucks and goods into places no one else can. Deb Drew's got herself a new career. In her previous life she was a model a mother and a business woman. Now she's a truck driver. She and driving partner Damo are about to set off on a trip to the dead centre of Australia, when they get a late change to their destination. They now need to head to Darwin adding three thousand kilometres to their journey and two days in the driving seat Steve Grahame has been driving for two days. His old engine has had a bad oil leak for the entire trip. If it's as bad as Steve suspects the engine could explode and the whole trip go up in smoke In Perth Mark Bolitho is getting his rig ready for another 7000 kilometre cross continent trip to Melbourne and back. Riding alongside on the trip will be mark's driving partner, Clare and their dog, Roy, who never misses a trip. Deb's having trouble with the gears on her truck. She's not used to a manual. With a further delay they are now starting 5 hours late really putting the pressure on. Then on the outskirts of Melbourne, the boss calls. On a mountainside Steve's road train is giving him all the wrong signals. His road train is fighting a mountain and the mountain is winning. If the hill wins and the truck stops, he's got a whole new battle on his hands. Clare and Mark's road train hits the edge of the vast Nullarbor Plain. Also on the road are two oversize trucks carrying mining equipment. Getting past them in a road train is going to be tricky. Steve's road train is stuck on the side of a hill. He was only a few metres from making it over the crest but now he's got the back-breaking job of uncoupling the trailers and pulling them over the top one by one. Mark and Clare have swapped drivers but while they were stopped, they were passed by the same wide load they overtook earlier. Clare's flying blind, relying on someone else's judgement on how safe it is to overtake. Turns out it's not safe at all. The light is just starting to go when Steve crosses the Barnett River. It's recently been in flood and there's heavy sand on the riverbed that traps Steve's truck. The fix could be as simple as shovelling some of the sand away. He can't leave the truck straddling the river over night. There's time for one last try. If this fails he's in serious trouble. On the edge of the Central Australian desert Deb's worried about the number of animals she's passing on the roadside. No cattle but plenty of sheep close to the road and three that decide they want to cross in front of her. Back on the highway Mark and Clare have two problems – Roy's playing up and the wide load they've passed twice already has passed them again. Last time Clare was called through there was a truck coming, this time they find another way to annoy her. Steve is tantalizingly close to his destination—only a hundred kilometres away. But he's still not confident to push his truck through on the muddy track. To make matters worse he has a slow-leaking tyre that he has to change. The community he's supplying is so close that reinforcements arrive. It's a long shot but maybe four-wheel drives can pull him free. Steve is eventually out but soon he hits another bog. As a last-ditch attempt, a grader is sent to try to pull him through. It's a dangerous job and it's Steve's last hope.
3	3	"Episode 3"	3 November 2012
Mark King is a heavy haulage specialist that has to haul a monster rig to a coal mine 700 kilometres away. It's too big for the road and there's a mountain range to cross. In the wilds of north Western Australia, veteran truckie Steve Grahame is in the middle of an epic journey, trying to deliver essential supplies to a remote community, but the weather and roads are conspiring against him. In the central Australian desert on the road to Alice Springs, ex-model turned truckie Deb Drew is into the fourth day of a 7000-kilometre trek from Melbourne to Darwin and back. Steve Grahame has been trying for more than a week to get his road train into Kalumburu and he's stuck just 70 kilometres from his destination. But on these tracks travelling 100 metres can take more than a day. The whole community is relying on Steve to make it through. He's carrying critical building supplies and food to fill the empty shelves of the local store. Mark King is a man with a mission – to get an eight-and-a-half-meter-wide, 100-tonne mining dump truck from Brisbane to the booming coalfields of Rollestone. Problem is he has to navigate the monster rig through Toowoomba's great dividing range. To add more pressure to an already impossible deadline the convoy can only travel through the city at night. Deb's got a plan to mix a little pleasure with the business of driving and make an unscheduled stop at a place she's always wanted to see, Uluru (Ayers Rock). But Deb has spotted a problem with one of her trailers and gets some unwanted attention from the law. Steve Grahame's road train has been stranded at a remote cattle station. Persistent rain has been filling up a bog hole that he needs to get through. Graders have been working at the hole and the sun has dried it out, to the point where Steve's ready to risk running his road train at it. There's no way he can turn his road train around out here so his decision is crucial, turn left and take on the bog hole, turn right and try a longer way. In the small hours of the morning Mark King's oversize load has hit a roadblock. No one told him about a new road surface being laid on the highway by a machine that's taking up the two lanes he needs to get by. There's a stand off between the road crew and Mark's crew. The delay is costing them precious time. If they're not out of the city by sun-up they break the curfew, and the police could order them to stop, leaving the rig stranded.
4	4	"Episode 4"	10 November 2012
Dougal Brett is one unusual truckie, he flies his own helicopter, owns a cattle station the size of a small country and a fleet of livestock trucks. His road trains have to haul 1500 cattle to a market nearly 3000 kilometres away. He's depending on the sale of his cattle to pay bills that have been piling up since the previous season when a live-export ban crippled the market. But the dirt tracks off his remote station are wet and getting wetter. Heavy haulage driver, Mark King is half-way through a marathon job. He's in charge of getting a monster mining truck from Brisbane to the central Queensland coal fields, 700 kilometres away. He has the equivalent of over 100 cars sitting on the back of his truck. But weight is not his only problem. Mark's convoy has to cross a series of mountain passes. The conditions of the road allow no margin for error. There's a police and pilot escort to help him but it's the driver who gets blamed if anything goes wrong. On a lonely dirt road at the top of north Western Australia, veteran Perth truckie Steve Grahame is a broken man. After an epic 3000-kilometre trek from Perth to the remote coastal community of Kalumburu, he's fallen just 50 kilometres short of his destination. Part of a dirt track has collapsed under the weight of his 100-tonne road train, burying the last two trailers up to their axles. Graders will try to pull him out. If this last attempt fails, Steve's trailers could be stuck here for the entire wet season. At Waterloo Station, the rain that stopped Dougal Brett from loading his cattle has cleared. The race is now on to get the cattle rounded up and into trucks before more wet-season rain makes the muddy roads even wetter. Driving cattle trucks with three double-decker trailers, carrying over 200 swaying animals is regarded as one of the toughest trucking jobs there is. And on bad roads, it's twice as tough. On the road to the Rolleston coal mine in central Queensland, Mark King is worried about the heat. Temperatures have passed the 40-degree mark and that's doing dangerous things to the road surface. Mark is worried his rig's 180-tonne weight and 650-horsepower engine could start ripping up the melting road from underneath him. Steve Grahame has crossed the last flooded river between him and his destination of Kalumburu. But his water worries are far from over, a massive storm's come out of nowhere. After a three-week struggle Steve's truck is bogged again just walking distance from his destination.
5	5	"Episode 5"	17 November 2012
In far North Queensland, tanker driver Steve Hughes is loading up for a supply run to remote clients who need fuel before the wet season cuts them off. At a Perth freight depot tempers are fraying. Husband and wife team, Gordon and Shui, have just finished a two-day non-stop drive but bad weather's caused them delays. Instead of resting at home, the boss has told them to turn around and do it all again. At the edge of the desert of the Nullarbor Plain, long-distance husband and wife trucking team Mark and Clare Bolitho are 8 hours into their weekly cross continent run. Riding with them on every trip is their 16-year-old dog Roy. Steve and his 28,000-litre load of fuel are heading up a mountain pass. With 20 tonnes of fuel on board, Steve's tanker strains on the steep incline. All he can do is watch, as car after car tries to squeeze past. Then one driver pushes his luck too far. Gordon and Shui are monitoring the sky for signs of the cyclone that's already played havoc with their schedule. Heavy rain has washed away large chunks of the highway. Blinding rain is making life hard for tanker driver Steve. His run is taking him deep into the tropical wilderness. Where roads become dirt tracks that can disappear under water in minutes. Back on the Nullarbor Plain, Roy isn't enjoying the ride. He's not been himself for most of the journey. Clare's increasingly worried. Out here there are no vets. Something is troubling Shui. One of the loads looked to have shifted even worse, something could have fallen off. Gordon and Shui have hit a flooded five-hundred-metre stretch of highway in front of them. Shui has to try to avoid the holes where the road has been washed out. If she drives too close to the edge of the bitumen, she risks ending up in the river. Their trip from hell is about to get worse. They arrive at their destination just as it's being savaged by the fringes of the cyclone. They need an address for another trailer pick-up. But the depot's deserted. Without checking the roads up ahead this is as far as Steve is prepared to go in his fuel tanker. He drives to the banks of a swollen river he can't cross. The station owner knows it's a lost cause. Steve can't deliver and heads for home before more rain arrives. After driving for two days, Mark and Clare have arrived in Adelaide. But the only cargo they're worried about is Roy. He needs to get to a vet quickly.

=== Season 2 (2014) ===
No. overall	No. in season	Title	Original release date
6	1	"Episode 1"	6 February 2014
Outback legend Steve Grahame is hauling three million dollars' worth of vital power generating equipment to an isolated community in the far North West of Australia – Kalumburu.
7	2	"Episode 2"	14 April 2014
It's mid-afternoon in Perth and Dion's super size convoy is pushing hard to get out of the city before sunset. And the fate of Steve's trip hangs on one phone call to his mechanic.
8	3	"Episode 3"	21 April 2014
Over the last three days, Steve Grahame has hauled 130 tonnes of freight a massive 2000 km, and his truck's taken a beating. Under the bonnet the news isn't good.
9	4	"Episode 4"	28 April 2014
Turbo faces a journey that takes him directly through an area affected by a bush fire. Plus, owner operator Yogi faces the biggest week of his career. But how will he get on?
10	5	"Episode 5"	5 May 2014
Turbo gambles his truck, not to mention his life, by taking a route through devastatingly tough terrain. And Yogi races to beat a vital deadline on a make or break job.
11	6	"Episode 6"	12 May 2014
Macca transports a world famous yacht on an arduous journey. Meanwhile, Russell is trying to get his business and his health back on the road to recovery.
12	7	"Episode 7"	19 May 2014
It's make or break for Turbo, as he simultaneously pushes his pain barrier and his truck to the limit. Meanwhile, Mark faces the biggest job of his career.
13	8	"Episode 8"	26 May 2014
Midway through a vital run Turbo is feeling the temperature as his rig overheats. Meanwhile, Mark Cromwell is fighting to complete the biggest job of his career.
14	9	"Episode 9"	2 June 2014
Russell battles waterlogged tracks in the desert as he tries to deliver his load on time. Meanwhile, Yogi's reputation is hanging in the balance on the biggest week of his career.
15	10	"Episode 10"	9 June 2014
Russell Mcdonough is in the midst of an outback nightmare, when a track collapses under the weight of his rig. Meanwhile, Yogi has some family time, but trouble lies ahead.
16	11	"Episode 11"	16 June 2014
Dirt road veteran Dennis Dent goes head-to-head with a lifelong nemesis. Meanwhile, Christian Reynolds takes on the wild back country on a vital mission to build a bridge.
17	12	"Episode 12"	23 June 2014
Turbo is fighting to stay on track and on schedule to complete a marathon trek home. Meanwhile, in Tasmania Euan is hitching a ride to deliver a volatile road.
18	13	"Episode 13"	30 June 2014
Steve Graham is racing the rain and joining forces to build a mega road train. Meanwhile, on a cross-country marathon, Yogi's truck hits the wall.

=== Season 3 (2015) ===
No. overall	No. in season	Title	Original release date
19	1	"Episode 1"	13 March 2015
In Townsville, Queensland, long-distance trucker Peter is getting set for a cross-country haul. He has to move this mixed freight through bush, farmland and desert to Darwin.
20	2	"Episode 2"	10 April 2015
Matt Adams rides a volatile load into a world of trouble with a bull on board. The Kendalls share a family experience of trucking and another haul carries a sting in the tail.
21	3	"Episode 3"	17 April 2015
Matt Adams is rustling up his roughest ride ever: Macca McReady sails into trouble with a precious load, and the Stephens brothers battle backyards and bogs to rescue their haul.
22	4	"Episode 4"	24 April 2015
Tanker driver Sludge must try to dodge disaster, Steve Graham suffers from his worst nightmare on the road and Macca McReady hits rough weather which throws him into jeopardy.
23	5	"Episode 5"	1 May 2015
Steve Grahame finds himself almost stranded with a desert island delivery. Yogi runs out of road, and two concrete specialists head off the map and into trouble.
24	6	"Episode 6"	8 May 2015
Jonny Rayner faces an impossible choice to either take on a crocodile-infested river at two o'clock in the morning, or wait until dawn and further delay his critical run.
25	7	"Episode 7"	15 May 2015
Jared and Johnny's epic mission grinds to a halt, Roscoe battles the elements on a world famous rally, and Turbo is flagged down by the boys in blue.
26	8	"Episode 8"	7 May 2015
Carl Andrews is at the wheel of a gargantuan load, Russell's mobile classroom gets shaken and his engine cooked, and the Ferrises dodge raging bush fires.
27	9	"Episode 9"	11 May 2015
All hell breaks loose for Turbo, Christian racks up massive mileage with a massive load and the Wise couple feel the pressure of a fuel-draining headwind.
28	10	"Episode 10"	12 May 2015
Mark Cromwell feels the pressure of a job worth 2 million dollars, Belinda is up to her neck in mess with a herd of cattle and Turbo's load is on the verge of destruction.
29	11	"Episode 11"	13 May 2015
Mark brings a city to a standstill with his multi-million-dollar load, Yogi is on an antiques roadshow where time is of the essence, and Turbo is in a dirt-road marathon dogfight.
30	12	"Episode 12"	14 May 2015
Sharon must move a copper mountain, and Sludge must move a freight of liquid that is highly flammable.
31	13	"Episode 13"	15 May 2015
Turbo pushes his luck, and his truck, as he tries to go the distance and deliver his load, while Bob tackles a mountain of timber.

=== Season 4 (2016) ===
No. overall	No. in season	Title	Original release date
32	1	"Episode 1"	6 May 2016
Steve gets a double dose of bad on a brutal lap through the red centre. Also, Turbo is back and battles to get his business out of a rut.
33	2	"Episode 2"	13 May 2016
Graham's race through the desert makes a sudden turn – from make to break. For the young trucker Will, it's hard rock and hard knocks during an urgent run to the races.
34	3	"Episode 3"	20 May 2016
Kurt gets lost when hauling a hut across Australia, meanwhile Johnny drags a stack of steel as well as a dust cloud up a horror desert track.
35	4	"Episode 4"	27 May 2016
There's trouble in the wind for Kurt who is struggling with a load causing oversized problems. For Johnny on the Tanami Track, it's too hard one minute and too soft the next.
36	5	"Episode 5"	3 June 2016
Mark and the team drag a heavy, million-dollar shed through the narrow streets of Adelaide. Livestock trucker Brenton has only three days to transport 20,000 cattle.
37	6	"Episode 6"	10 June 2016
Mark runs into some strange weather. Turbo goes head-to-head with an angry customer, and Shane Kenny wrestles with an old truck.
38	7	"Episode 7"	18 July 2016
It's trial by fire for Russell as he hauls a mobile building down a load-destroying track. Also, Jacko rushes a monster load, as well as a worried passenger, to a big show. Monster Jam!
39	8	"Episode 8"	19 July 2016
The Mackay Brothers try to dodge destruction. Meanwhile, Steve takes on an old enemy and Bumpa Farrell struggles for power on a huge hay convoy.
40	9	"Episode 9"	20 July 2016
Steve could face some problems when taking on the Tanami with a trailer load of trouble, and it's a wild ride for Nigel Vagg as he hauls 900 feral goats through a heatwave.
41	10	"Episode 10"	21 July 2016
Sludge and the Phantom battle the elements, an old river boat takes a bumpy road to be repaired, and Turbo has problems with wheel bearings and weight weather.
42	11	"Episode 11"	15 July 2016
Sludge takes on foreign roads and strange loads in New Zealand, Turbo's new truck gets busted on a tour of destruction and Carl Andrews has more worry than one trucker can take.
43	12	"Episode 12"	22 July 2016
Sludge travels up a mountain with an angry load. Also, Cameron carts a huge dump truck out of the Nullarbor, and Steve tries to avoid downpours on an urgent mission.
44	13	"Episode 13"	26 July 2016
Steve tackles the mud with high voltage headaches. Sludge's mountain mission goes downhill, while Cameron's journey gets hotter and harder.

=== Season 5 (2017) ===
No. overall	No. in season	Title	Original release date
45	1	"Episode 1"	16 May 2017
Husband and wife team Nick and Jo face tough driving conditions with volatile cargo. Plus, Yogi makes a costly mistake during a two-week stint on the road.
46	2	"Episode 2"	23 May 2017
A house relocation goes off-track when drivers Ross and Jerry are faced with power poles blocking their way. Russel tackles a graveyard of wrecked cars in the heart of the desert.
47	3	"Episode 3"	30 May 2017
While preparing for a gruelling trip from Perth to Darwin, Steve faces a malfunctioning clutch. Plus, Robbie and his crew embark on a challenging trip moving a timber house.
48	4	"Episode 4"	6 June 2017
The Mackay's monster house moving convoy irritates drivers as they race to make curfew.
49	5	"Episode 5"	13 June 2017
Mark is under pressure to deliver a fragile electrical control room to a remote mine deep in the outback. Plus, Jeff is confronted with a heavy storm while on the road in Tasmania.
50	6	"Episode 6"	20 June 2017
Road flooding means Mark and his crew must work against the clock to deliver a fragile load to a remote gold mine. And Jeff faces a treacherous pass in wet conditions.
51	7	"Episode 7"	27 June 2017
Country boy Anthony and city wife Danyelle battle bogs and blocked bores to bring water to desperate cattle stations.
52	8	"Episode 8"	4 July 2017
Steve Grahame feels the pressure as he heads off the dirt and onto the bitumen and into road closures.
53	9	"Episode 9"	11 July 2017
Mark prepares a massive load travelling from South Australia all the way to a tiny island in Micronesia. And Mick transports a curious giraffe through Sydney traffic.
54	10	"Episode 10"	18 July 2017
Extreme weather and crumbling infrastructure make a short journey across a remote Pacific island one of Mark Cromwell's most challenging jobs ever.
55	11	"Episode 11"	25 July 2017
In Central Australia, Brad Duckworth's run of bad luck threatens to put the brakes on the construction of an outback airstrip.
56	12	"Episode 12"	1 August 2017
Paul 'Blinky' Cunningham gets the wind put up him as he moves the largest turbines in Australia from the Port of Newcastle to the White Rock Wind Farm.
57	13	"Episode 13"	8 August 2017
Steve Grahame battles wild animals and deep sand as he takes on the Great Central Road for the first time since the Wet.

=== Season 6 (2018) ===
No. overall	No. in season	Title	Original release date
58	1	"Episode 1"	8 May 2018
59	2	"Episode 2"	15 May 2018
Brother and sister truckers Robbie and Ashleigh Mackay hit house removal hell on a mud-bogged mission.
60	3	"Episode 3"	22 May 2018
Outback trucking legend Steve Grahame and his faithful canine companion Bella take a monster load cross-country from the red centre to the west coast.
61	4	"Episode 4"	29 May 2018
Russell "Crusher" McDonagh hits problem after problem on a dash for cash.
62	5	"Episode 5"	5 June 2018
Long distance legend Steve Grahame battles to get to a remote mining outpost.
63	6	"Episode 6"	12 June 2018
Yogi prepares for a showdown with transport police in South Australia.
64	7	"Episode 7"	19 June 2018
Steve Grahame navigates flooded highways and washouts in a marathon 6000 km drive.
65	8	"Episode 8"	26 June 2018
Trainee trucker Danyelle Haigh gets a brutal driving lesson as her family's water drilling rig heads for cattle country.
66	9	"Episode 9"	3 July 2018
Woody's urgent food delivery to a remote desert community is jeopardised by a leaking fridge unit.
67	10	"Episode 10"	10 July 2018
Nick and Jo mount a delicate rescue operation to recover a World War 2 bomber from its outback grave.
68	11	"Episode 11"	17 July 2018
Russell Crusher runs into trouble taking his new metal muncher to clean up an eyesore at Uluru.
69	12	"Episode 12"	24 July 2018
Torrential rain plays havoc with Robbie Mackay's efforts to relocate a home without wrecking it.
70	13	"Episode 13"	31 July 2018
Cyclonic weather threatens to stop tanker driver Mick King delivering hazardous chemicals to a desert mine site.

=== Season 7 (2019) ===
No. overall	No. in season	Title	Original release date
71	1	"Episode 1"	28 May 2019
Trucking veteran Steve Grahame's heading to the beach, but it's no vacation.
72	2	"Episode 2"	4 June 2019
In Central Australia, 450 kilometres from Alice Springs, outback legend Steve Grahame is hot and bothered.
73	3	"Episode 3"	11 June 2019
Owner operator Justin Harrison's on an epic haul up through the red heart of Australia.
74	4	"Episode 4"	18 June 2019
Husband and wife trucking team Nick and Jo Atkins are about to embark on a dangerous trek north through one of the world's last wilderness frontiers.
75	5	"Episode 5"	25 June 2019
Ross Carrigy is returning from the remote north Queensland community of Kowanyama at the start of the wet season.
76	6	"Episode 6"	2 July 2019
In the Northern Territory the wet season's about to break and veteran road train trucker Mark Pett is hauling 78 tonnes of cement and steel straight into a disaster zone.
77	7	"Episode 7"	9 July 2019
In the Australian Outback when the going gets tough the tough drive trucks. Outback truckers drive the biggest trucks on Earth along the toughest roads and loneliest highways.
78	8	"Episode 8"	16 July 2019
Livestock trucker Troy Coombe is facing wild weather and wild passengers, transporting two Ostriches to their new home.
79	9	"Episode 9"	23 July 2019
Bureaucracy threatens to derail Yogi's mercy mission to drought ravaged farmers.
80	10	"Episode 10"	30 July 2019
History threatens to repeat itself as Steve Grahame and convoy partner Sy Howells battle the roads and the weather to reach a remote community before the wet season leaves them stranded.
81	11	"Episode 11"	6 August 2019
Fourth generation loggers the Bennet Brothers, Adrian and Neil battle an inferno that's destroying hectares of Tasmania's bushland, threatening their business and lives.
82	12	"Episode 12"	13 August 2019
Tasmanian trucker, Ricky Sutcliffe, lays his life on the line driving into a inferno, rescuing bull dozer drivers trapped as they cut firebreaks in the blazing Huon Valley.
83	13	"Episode 13"	20 August 2019
Truck drivers Ash Bryant and Darryl Armfield are on a time critical job shifting 200 cattle over 500 kilometres of bush roads – but have they driven straight into trouble?

=== Season 8 (2020) ===
No. overall	No. in season	Title	Original release date
84	1	"Episode 1"	5 May 2020
85	2	"Episode 2"	12 May 2020
86	3	"Episode 3"	19 May 2020
87	4	"Episode 4"	26 May 2020
88	5	"Episode 5"	2 June 2020
89	6	"Episode 6"	9 June 2020
90	7	"Episode 7"	16 June 2020
91	8	"Episode 8"	23 June 2020
92	9	"Episode 9"	30 June 2020
93	10	"Episode 10"	7 July 2020
94	11	"Episode 11"	14 July 2020
95	12	"Episode 12"	21 July 2020
96	13	"Episode 13"	28 July 2020

== See also ==
- List of Australian television series
- Ice Road Truckers
