= Prospero Productions =

- Industry: Television production
- Founded: 1991
- Headquarters: Fremantle, Australia
- Key people: Julia Redwood (MD)
- Products: Documentary; Entertainment

Prospero Productions is an Australian-based television production company based in Fremantle, Western Australia specialising in maritime documentaries and light entertainment.

== Background ==
Prospero Productions was formed in Fremantle, Western Australia in 1991 by Ed Punchard and Julia Redwood. It is now owned solely by Julia Redwood.

Their latest production is Ningaloo: Australia's Other Great Reef. Using a mini-submersible, filming took place at Ningaloo Reef and features marine scientist Anna Cresswell. The production is filmed in 4K and will be screened on dome screens. The production premieres at the WA Maritime Museum in Fremantle in late December 2018.

In early 2016, Discovery Channel would pick up two of Prospero's productions, Railroad Australia would play on Discovery Asia while Outback Truckers will play on Discovery Italy and Discovery Canada. Outback Truckers would view on Canal D in Canada and on TVNZ in New Zealand. In their production Martin Clunes in Islands of Oz, a three-part documentary series, featured on Channel Seven in October 2016 and explored the remote and spectacular islands around Australia.

== Productions ==
- Junior Doctors Down Under (2024)
- Outback Farm (2023-2024)
- Opal Hunters Red Dirt Road Trip (2022)
- Whale Super Highway (2019)
- Outback Truckers Season (2012-2021)
- Ningaloo: Australia's Other Great Reef (2018)
- Outback Opal Hunters (2018–19)
- Railroad Australia (2016-2018)
- Islands of Oz (2016)
- Outback Pilots (2016)
- Wild Survivor (2014)
- The Real Jaws (2014)
- Australia - Life on the Edge (2013)
- Change My Race (2013)
- Vet School (2012)
- Jack the Ripper - Australia's Killer (2011)
- The Man Who Jumped (2011)
- Ned's Head (2011)
- Dino Stampede (2011)
- SAS - The Search For Warriors (2011)
- Pirate Patrol (2010)
- Gallipoli's Deep Secrets (2010)
- Every Family's Nightmare (2009)
- Heartbreak Science (2009)
- Navy Divers (2009)
- Death of the Megabeasts (2008)
- The Snake Crusader (2008)
- Eco House Challenge (2007)
- Pipe Dreams (2007)
- Kindness of Strangers (2006)
- Shipwreck Detectives 2 (2005)
- Aussie Animal Rescue 2 (2004)
- The Snakebuster (2003)
- Shipwreck Detectives (2002)
- Aussie Animal Rescue (2001)
- Selling Australia (2000)
- Diving School (1999)
- Paying For The Piper (1998)
- Home of the Blizzard (1997)
- Hutan: Wildlife of the Malaysian Rainforest (1996)
- Shipwreck Coast Part 2: The Gelignite Buccaneer (1995)
- Shipwreck Coast Part 1: The Batavia - Wreck, Mutiny & Murder (1994)
- No Survivors ()

== Honours and awards ==
In 1998, Prospero was nominate for an Australian Film Institute Award for Best Documentary for its production of Paying For The Piper. Paying for the Piper would also feature at the United Nations Association Film Festival (2000), Golden Gate Awards - San Francisco Film Society (2000) and the International Festival of Maritime and Exploration Film (1999). Prospero Production would win the 2007 Australian Government's Eureka Prize for Science Journalism for The Kindness of Strangers. In 2011, Prospero won the AACTA Award for Best Documentary Series for its production of SAS - The Search for Warriors. The Eco House production would win an Australian Teachers of Media Inc award in 2007 and was a finalist in the United Nations World Environment Day Awards. Diving School would play at the Golden Gate Awards - San Francisco Film Society in 2001. In 2015, Australia- Life on the Edge won a Gold Prestige Film Award for Short Documentary.

On 4 June 2021, Julia Redwood won the business category in the 2021 West Australian of the Year Awards.
