= Bishop Rock =

Skerry of the coast of Cornwall, England

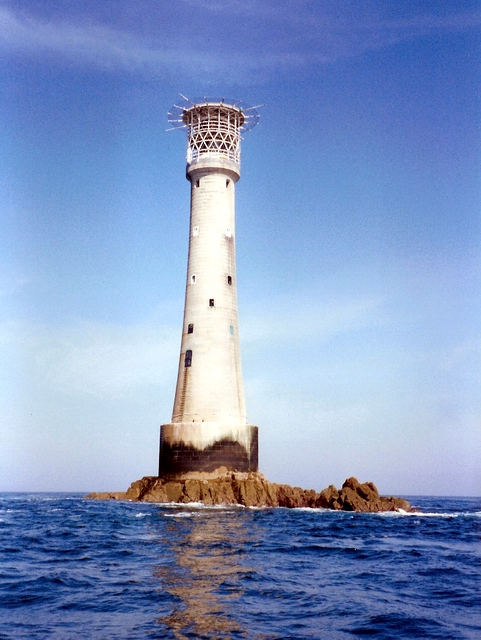
Bishop Rock with its lighthouse

The Bishop Rock (Cornish: Men an Epskop) is a skerry off the British coast in the northern Atlantic Ocean known for its lighthouse. It is in the westernmost part of the Isles of Scilly, an archipelago 45 kilometres (24 nautical miles) off the southwestern tip of the Cornish peninsula of Great Britain. The Guinness Book of Records lists it as the world's smallest island with a building on it.

The original iron lighthouse was begun in 1847 but was washed away before it could be completed. The present building was completed in 1858 and was first lit on 1 September that year. Before the installation of the helipad, visitors to the lighthouse would rappel from the base (with winches installed at the lamp level and at the base) to boats waiting away from the lighthouse.

Bishop Rock is also at the eastern end of the North Atlantic shipping route used by ocean liners in the first half of the 20th century; the western end being the entrance to Lower New York Bay. This was the route that ocean liners took when competing for the transatlantic speed record, known as the Blue Riband.

== History ==
In the late 13th century, when the Isles of Scilly were under the jurisdiction of John de Allet and his wife Isabella, anyone convicted of felony "ought to be taken to a certain rock in the sea, with two barley loaves and a pitcher of water and left until the sea swallowed him up". The rock was originally recorded as Maen Escop in 1284 and Maenenescop in 1302. In Cornish, Men Eskop means "Bishop's Stone", whilst Men an Eskop means "the Stone of the Bishop". The outer rocks to the west of St Agnes also used to be known as the Bishop and Clerk, but exactly how they acquired these similar names is not known for certain. A possible explanation is that the shape of the rock is similar to a bishop's mitre.

East of Bishop Rock are the Western Rocks and the Gilstone Reef, where Admiral Shovell's flagship HMS Association was wrecked in the great naval disaster of 1707. Shovell's remains were repatriated to the English mainland by order of Queen Anne shortly after their initial burial in the Isles of Scilly. A commonly circulated story holds that a crew member on board the Association told Admiral Shovell that the fleet was close by Scilly, but Shovell ignored this and hanged the man for insubordination, There is, however, no evidence for this incident, which is most likely apocryphal. In fact, the fleet had been blown off course by stormy weather, having been carried further north than their dead reckoning suggested, whilst the position of Scilly on nautical charts of the time was far from accurate, the islands often being marked as much further north than they are.

The earliest recorded wreck on the rock itself was in 1839, when the brig Theodorick struck in rough, misty weather on 4 September. She was sailing from Mogodore, Morocco, to London carrying a general cargo. In the early hours of 12 October 1842, the 600-tonne paddle steamer Brigand, a packet boat, which was en route from Liverpool to St Petersburg, struck the rock with such force that it stove in two large bow plates. The rocks then acted as a pivot, and she swung round and heeled into the rock port side, crushing the paddle wheel and box to such an extent that it penetrated the engine room. She drifted over seven miles in two hours before sinking in 90 metres (300 ft). All the crew were saved. In 1901 a barque named Falkland struck the rock, her main yard hitting the lighthouse itself.

== Lighthouse ==
Bishop Rock Lighthouse Golowji Men an Epskop
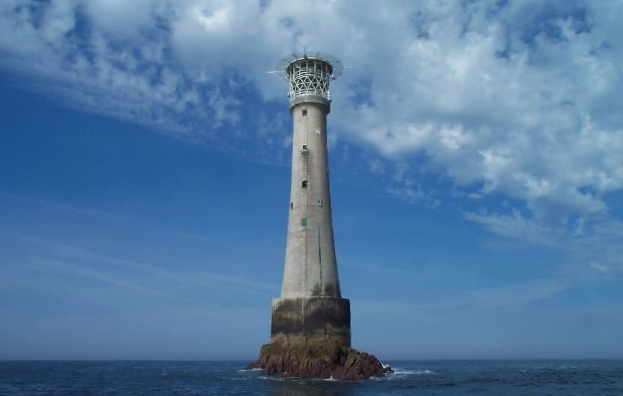
- Bishop Rock Lighthouse in 2005
- Location: Bishop Rock, Isles of Scilly, United Kingdom
- OS grid: SV8070706442
- Coordinates: 49°52′22″N 6°26′44″W

Tower
- Constructed: 1858
- Built by: James Walker
- Construction: granite (tower)
- Automated: 1992
- Height: 49 m (161 ft)
- Shape: tapered cylindrical tower with lantern and helipad on the top
- Markings: unpainted tower, white lantern
- Operator: Trinity House
- Heritage: Grade II listed building
- Racon: T

Light
- First lit: 1887 (rebuilt)
- Focal height: 44 m (144 ft)
- Lens: Hyperradiant Fresnel 1330 mm Rotating
- Intensity: 60,000 candela
- Range: 20 nmi (37 km; 23 mi)
- Characteristic: Fl(2) W 15s

Listed Building – Grade II
- Official name: Bishop Rock Lighthouse
- Designated: 14 December 1992
- Reference no.: 1292068

An 1818 report by the Surveyor-General of the Duchy of Cornwall on the dangers to shipping in Cornwall proposed that a lighthouse be built, similar to the Eddystone Lighthouse, upon Bishop Rock, given its location as the westernmost rock of the Isles of Scilly. The plan was considered by the government and building was expected soon, as the engineer John Rennie the Elder made an offer to build it. The government did not take up the offer, but Trinity House surveyed Bishop Rock in 1843 with a view to building a lighthouse and, under their Engineer-in-Chief, James Walker, construction work began in 1847.

=== Walker's first tower ===
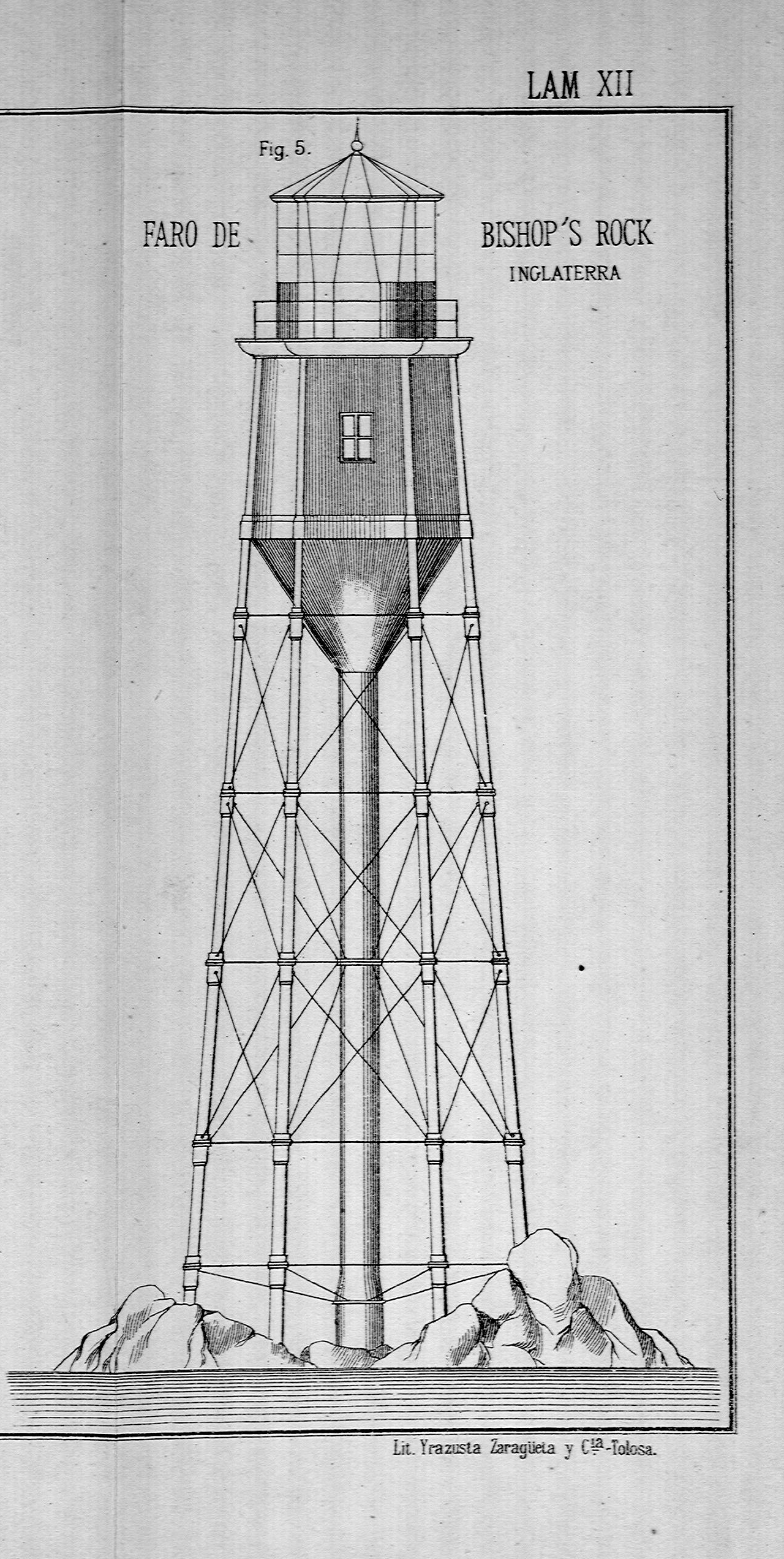
Bishop Rock screw-pile first lighthouse according to a drawing by José Eugenio Ribera.

Walker had decided on a 120-foot-tall (37-metre) design consisting of accommodation and a light on top of iron legs. The light was never lit, since on 5 February 1850 (before the lantern and lighting equipment had been fitted) a storm washed the tower away. (A few years later, the lantern that had been intended for this tower was installed instead on another Walker-designed tower, Godrevy Lighthouse in St Ives Bay in Cornwall.)

=== Walker's second tower ===
In the second attempt, James Walker began building a stone structure in 1851. The site presented a number of difficulties: the paucity of available land area and the slope of the rock meant that the lowest stone had to be laid below the low water level of the lowest spring tides. The resident engineer was Nicholas Douglass assisted by his sons (first James and then William). Despite multiple problems over the seven-year period of construction, the tower was completed without loss of life. It was fitted with a 4-wick oil lamp by Wilkins & Son and a large (first order) fixed catadioptric optic by Henry Lépaute, and shone its light for the first time on 1 September 1858. The total cost of the lighthouse was £34,559.

==== Keepers' dwellings ====
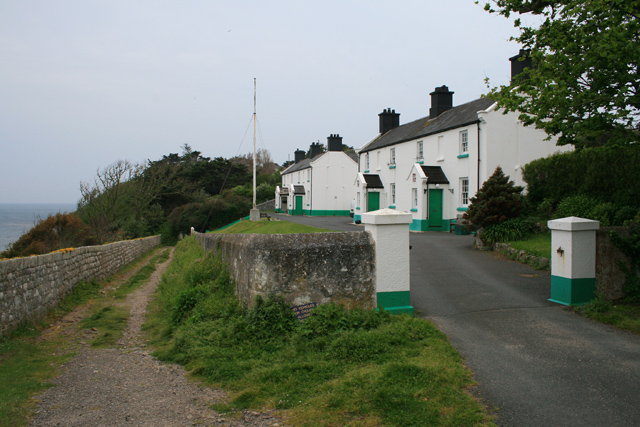
Trinity Cottages, The Garrison, St Mary's, dating from 1858

As the lighthouse was nearing completion, a set of dwellings was constructed on St Mary's to accommodate the keepers's families and the keepers themselves when they were not on station. The light at the time was kept by a team of four: at any one time, three would be on station in the lighthouse, and the fourth on leave on St Mary's.

==== Exposed to the elements ====
Faced with the full force of the Atlantic, Walker's lighthouse proved vulnerable: in heavy weather the tower regularly shook, the vibrations being powerful enough to cause objects to fall from shelves, and even causing the optical apparatus to fracture. The lighthouse had initially been provided with a 3-long-hundredweight (150-kilogram) fog bell; however this was washed away during a storm in January 1860. (It was replaced with a larger bell, but not until 1864; the bell was sounded once every ten seconds). Over the years that followed various expediencies were tried to mitigate the effects of heavy weather upon the lighthouse.

During an especially heavy storm in April 1874 the tower was severely and repeatedly shaken by a succession of 120 ft (37 m) waves, which shattered the reinforced glass of the lantern and sent cascades of water down through the living quarters. Later that year James Douglass (who had succeeded Walker as Engineer-in-chief at Trinity House) returned to Bishop Rock with a team of men to reinforce the lower section of the tower using broad iron bands, which were bolted through the stonework.

In the winter of 1881 a further series of storms battered the lighthouse, wrenching sizeable blocks of granite away from the structure just above the high water mark. James Douglass was again sent to inspect the tower and he reported that its structural safety had been seriously affected. He began drawing up designs to reinforce the structure by laying massive granite blocks into the rock and dove-tailing them onto the lighthouse.

=== Douglass's 'strengthening and improvement' ===
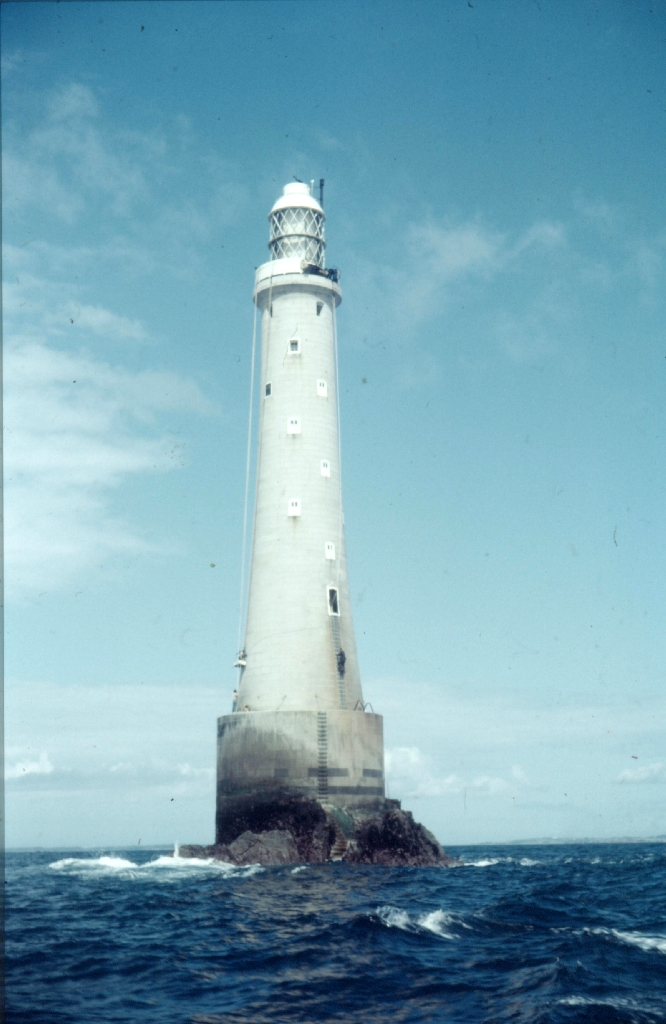
Bishop Rock lighthouse as rebuilt by Douglass (photographed in 1966).

Douglass's plan of renovation for the lighthouse would have amounted to a near complete rebuilding: it involved fully encasing Walker's tower within new external courses of granite, then removing the old lantern storey and existing internal floors before increasing the strengthened tower's height by a further 40 feet (12 metres). At the same time, he sought to diminish the impact of waves upon the tower by making the base section cylindrical, rather than conical. The work began in 1883 under the supervision of Sir James's eldest surviving son, William Tregarthen Douglass; use was made of construction equipment which had become available following completion of the new Eddystone lighthouse (which had also been designed by Douglass) the previous year. The stones were cut and dressed off site, to precise dimensions, before being conveyed to the rock by steamer and then individually winched ashore. It took until 1886 for the time-consuming work of integrating the new stonework with the old to be completed, up to the height of the existing structure. Thereafter things moved more swiftly and the tower as a whole was finished in 1887.

==== New optical and other equipment ====
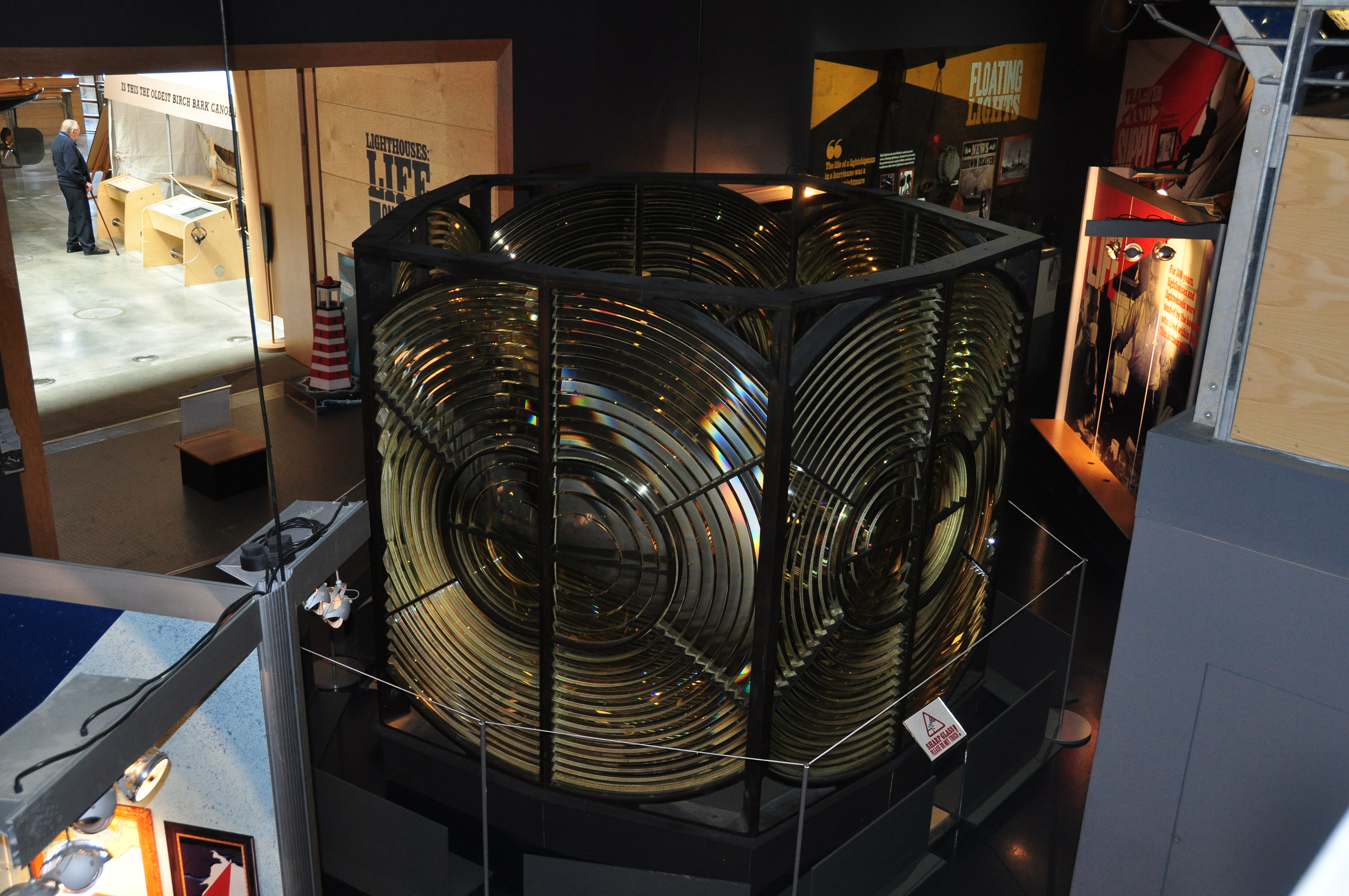
Top tier of the 1881 optic on display at the National Maritime Museum; as of 2021 the identical lower tier remains in use in the lighthouse.

Douglass topped his rebuilt tower with a double-height lantern storey, designed to contain a 'biform' optical system designed and built by Chance Brothers (consisting of two identical lamps and lens arrays, one mounted above the other). Each tier consisted of an eight-wick paraffin burner set within a revolving array of extra large hyperradiant Fresnel lenses (consisting, on each level, of five pairs of lens panels, displaying two white flashes every minute). In clear weather the lower tier alone was used, with its lamp on half power; in limited visibility (as judged by the clarity of the light visible from St Agnes's Lighthouse, five nautical miles (nine kilometres) away) both tiers were used with the lamps at full power. The new improved light had a range of 18 1/4 nautical miles (34 kilometres); it was first lit on 25 October 1887. (The old dioptric apparatus was removed and later re-used: at Hurst Point and in the low light at Nash Point.)

The heavy new optic was turned by a small air engine placed in the pedestal; compressed air was provided from a set of tanks, located in the room below along with a pair of Davey 'Safety' Engines, which drove the compressors. The compressed air could also be used, by day, to drive a small gallery-mounted winch for landing stores.

As part of the new installation, the lighthouse was equipped with an explosive fog signal: in foggy weather the keepers regularly had to attach a guncotton charge together with a detonator to a jib-type apparatus on the lantern gallery; from inside the lantern they would then raise the jib and fire the charge electrically. The explosive signal remained in use until 1976.

==== Later developments ====
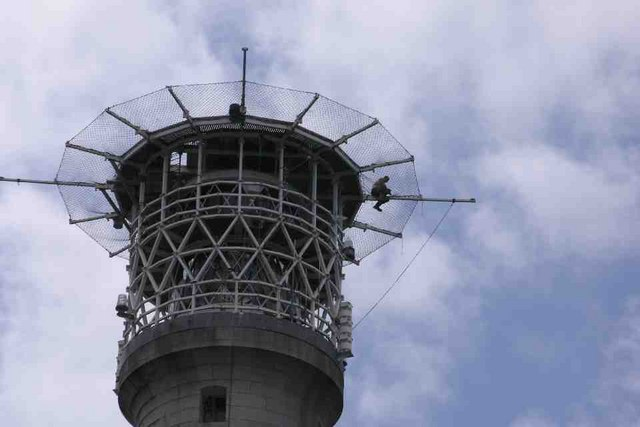
Close-up of the helipad, installed over the lantern in 1976.

In 1902 a new clockwork mechanism was installed to turn the lenses; by this time the optic had been modified to float in an annular mercury bath, which enabled it to turn much more freely. Two years later incandescent oil burners replaced the old multi-wick burners; they were upgraded with the installation of 'Hood' incandescent burners in 1922. A Stuart Turner diesel engine provided power to turn the optic. A separate small Petter-engined generator provided electricity for the keepers' domestic use from 1955; it replaced a petrol-driven machine which had been installed during the war to power a radiotelephone (enabling direct verbal communication with ships, the shore and other nearby lighthouses). The main lantern was electrified in 1973 with the provision of Lister diesel generator set; Bishop Rock was one of the last lighthouses to be electrified.

Difficulty reaching the lighthouse by boat led Trinity House to build a helipad on top of the lighthouse in 1976. That same year a supertyfon fog horn was installed with sounders arranged around the gallery.

On 15 December 1992 the tower became fully automated; the lower half of the biform optic remained in use following automation whilst the top half was removed and put on display (it is currently in the National Maritime Museum Cornwall). An electric fog signal replaced the supertyfon at this time, sounding a long followed by a short tone every 90 seconds; its use was discontinued in 2007.

On the 144th anniversary of the destruction of James Walker's original iron tower (5 February 1994), a storm caused severe damage to the gunmetal entry doors, which had to be replaced; they too became an exhibit at the National Maritime Museum in Falmouth.

=== Structure ===
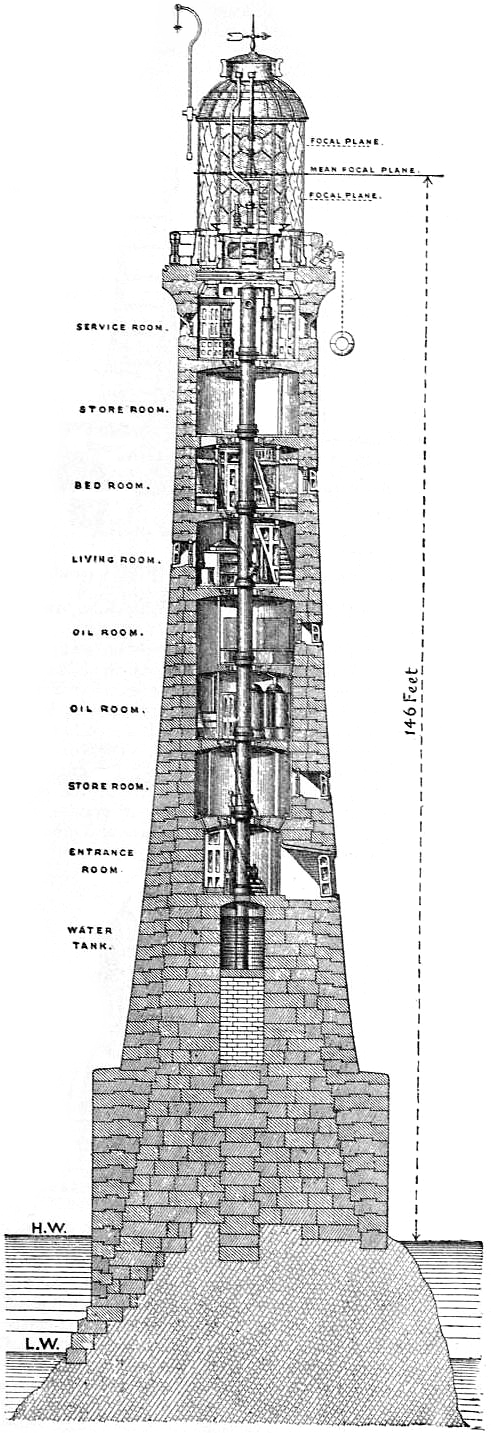
Sectional drawing of Bishop Rock lighthouse as rebuilt in 1887

Bishop Lighthouse is often referred to as "King of the lighthouses". With a height of 49 metres (161 ft) the lighthouse is the tallest in England, together with Eddystone Lighthouse.

Expenditure on the lighthouses at Bishop Rock include: The first iron lighthouse: £12,500 The second granite lighthouse: £34,559 (equivalent to £3,713,000 in 2025) The third improved lighthouse: £64,889 (equivalent to £7,377,000 in 2025) Total cost: £111,948

The interior of the light house consists of the following (as described in 1911): Below and inside the lighthouse are 10 floors with spiral staircase to the 2nd floor with a door (made from gun metal (likely bronze) and installed in 1887) that leads down an external metal (likely bronze) ladder to climb down to the large exterior base. From the base another metal ladder provides access to a stone staircase to the waterline.

Prior to automation, the floors of the lighthouse were occupied as follows in 1911 (with later changes of use noted in italics):

- 1st floor – Water tank (providing fresh water for lighthouse keepers)
- 2nd floor – Entrance room with metal door leading to exterior ladder to base below
- 3rd floor – Store room, with window (later contained fuel tanks for the generators)
- 4th floor – First oil room, with oil tanks formerly used to light the lamp (later the engine room)
- 5th floor – Second oil room, with window (later the 'amenity room')
- 6th floor – Living room for lighthouse keepers, with window (later the kitchen)
- 7th floor – Bedroom for lighthouse keepers, with window
- 8th floor – Store room (later the living room)
- 9th floor – Service room
- 10th floor – Lantern

== Culture and media ==
In December 1946, the BBC sent two radio reporters, Edward Ward and Stanley Coombs, to Bishop Rock as part of a programme of round-the-world Christmas messages, a format that had already been used before the Second World War. Gale-force winds and heavy seas prevented their return for almost a month, and food supplies for the five men in the lighthouse began to run out. A lifeboat finally reached the lighthouse on 16 January 1947 and the two reporters were lowered into the boat by rope while the sea was still rough.

The rock is the subject of a short orchestral descriptive work by the late Doreen Carwithen (Mary Alwyn), which was recorded by the London Symphony Orchestra under the baton of Richard Hickox.

The lighthouse was used as a filming location for one of the BBC One 'Circle' idents, and was also featured in the last segment of the documentary series Three Men in More Than One Boat. The lighthouse was also featured in the 2010 BBC documentary Islands of Britain, presented by Martin Clunes.

The lighthouse was the feature of a 42 minute BBC documentary in 1973 called The Last Lighthouse which followed the everyday duties and lives of several lightkeepers on the rock over a 60 day tour of duty. This is available on YouTube as part of the BBC Archive.

The lighthouse featured in BBC TV children's programme Blue Peter in 1975, when presenter Lesley Judd visited. "Disaster nearly struck as she travelled by rope to the lighthouse from a boat. Her harness support dropped to her ankles, leaving Lesley with no support should she lose her grip on the rope."

The lighthouse also features in the short story "Keeper of the Bishop" by A. E. W. Mason.

== See also ==
- List of shipwrecks of the Isles of Scilly
- List of lighthouses in England
