= Islands of Britain (TV series) =

- Presented by: Martin Clunes
- Country of origin: United Kingdom
- No. of series: 1
- No. of episodes: 3

Production
- Producers: Martin Small; Claire Meech; Rebecca Saponiere; Raghav Shome
- Running time: 45 minutes
- Production company: ITV Productions

Original release
- Network: ITV
- Release: 3 May – 17 May 2009

Related
- Islands of Oz

Islands of Britain is a 2009 documentary series, filmed over the summers of 2008 and 2009 and hosted by Martin Clunes, which visited a number of the islands that lie off the coast of Great Britain and Northern Ireland, as well as the Channel Islands.

== Episodes ==
=== Episode 1: The North ===
Visited Muckle Flugga, Forewick Holm, and Unst in the Shetland Islands then Lewis and Harris, Eigg and Barra in the Outer Hebrides.

=== Episode 2: The West ===
Visited Piel Island in Cumbria, Islay in the Inner Hebrides, the Isle of Man, and Rathlin off the coast of Northern Ireland.

=== Episode 3: The South ===
Visited Guernsey and Sark in the Channel Islands, St. Michael's Mount, and St Martin's, St Mary's, St Agnes, and Bishop Rock in the Isles of Scilly.

== International adaptation ==
An Australian version of the series titled Martin Clunes: Islands of Australia aired on the Seven Network in 2016, and was co-produced by Buffalo Pictures and hosted by Clunes.
