= Martin Clunes =

English actor (born 1961)

Martin Clunes OBE DL
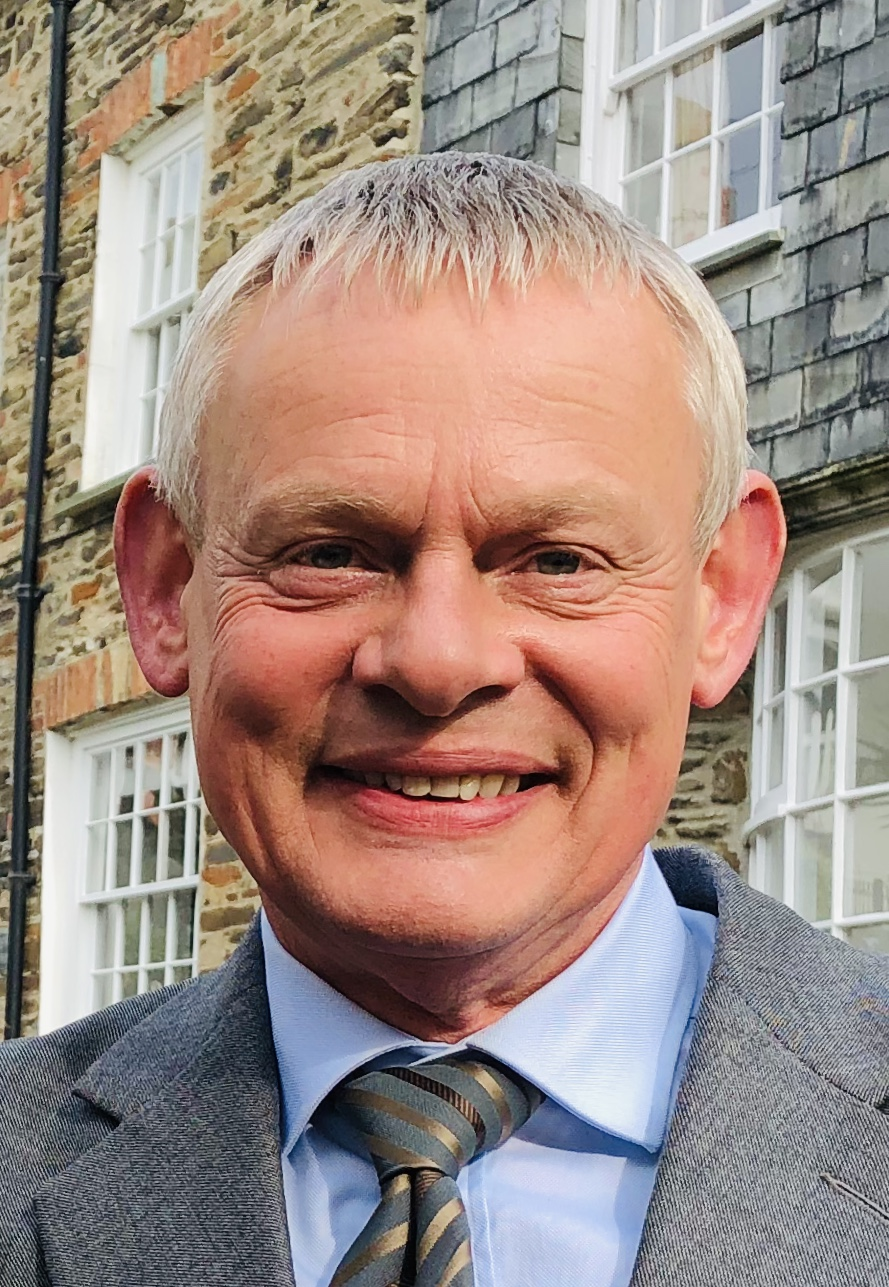
- Clunes in 2019
- Born: Alexander Martin Clunes; 28 November 1961 (age 64); Wimbledon, England
- Education: Arts Educational Schools
- Occupations: Actor; director; television presenter
- Years active: 1982–present
- Spouses: Lucy Aston (m. 1990; div. 1997) Philippa Braithwaite (m. 1997)
- Children: 1
- Father: Alec Clunes
- Relatives: Jeremy Brett (cousin-once-removed)
- Martin Clunes' voice from the BBC programme Desert Island Discs, 18 September 2011.

Alexander Martin Clunes (born 28 November 1961) is an English actor, director, and television presenter. He is best known for portraying Martin Ellingham in the ITV comedy-drama series Doc Martin, Gary Strang in the BBC sitcom Men Behaving Badly, and William Shawcross in William and Mary. Clunes has narrated a number of documentaries for ITV, the first of which was Islands of Britain in 2009. He has since presented a number of documentaries centred on animals. He has also voiced Kipper the Dog in the preschool animated series Kipper.

Clunes was appointed an Officer of the Order of the British Empire (OBE) in the 2015 Birthday Honours for services to drama, charity, and the community in Dorset.

== Early life ==
Clunes was born in Wimbledon (then in Surrey, now in Greater London), the son of actor Alec Clunes and his second wife, Daphne (née Acott) Clunes, who worked as his secretary, following a "grim year" where she previously worked for Orson Welles. He was given Alexander as a first name (after his father and grandfather) as his mother was concerned that if it was his middle name, the initials MAC would be open to the potential of the nickname "Mac". His father, a pipe smoker, died of lung cancer when Clunes was eight years old. He was privately educated at the Royal Russell School in Croydon, and participated in school plays; he later attended the Arts Educational Schools, London. He has an older sister, who resides on the Isle of Wight. The actor Jeremy Brett was his uncle. (Note: According to other sources, Clunes is either his cousin or 2nd cousin, once removed.)

== Career ==
Clunes played his first role in rep at the Mercury Theatre, Colchester, and his first television appearance was in an adaptation of Mikhail Bulgakov's The White Guard for the BBC Play of the Month in 1982, followed by the Doctor Who story Snakedance in 1983. A sporadic career led to his supplementing his income as a photo model for Gilbert and George, and he can be seen in their 1983 work World. He got his first regular television role as one of the sons in the BBC sitcom No Place Like Home, and then starred in two series of the sitcom All at No 20.

While Clunes was appearing on stage at the Hampstead Theatre, Harry Enfield came to see him; the acquaintanceship developed into a friendship where Clunes played characters in Enfield's sketch shows (most notably one of the Rugby Players). Enfield then recommended Clunes for the role of Gary in the sitcom Men Behaving Badly, written for Enfield by Simon Nye, for which Clunes won a British Academy Television Award for Best Comedy Performance in 1996. He played the part of Group Captain Barker in the two-part TV mini-series Over Here that same year. In 1993, he played Dick Dobson in Demob about a pair of demobilised soldiers who have to adjust to civilian life after entertaining Second World War troops with a raunchy cabaret act.

Since 1994, Clunes has frequently appeared on the BBC One panel show Have I Got News for You as a panelist or a guest presenter. Clunes has since appeared in films and television shows such as An Evening with Gary Lineker, Staggered (starred and directed), Hunting Venus, The Booze Cruise, Saving Grace and Jeeves and Wooster. In 1998, he was featured in Sweet Revenge and appeared as Richard Burbage in the film Shakespeare in Love. Clunes has also acted frequently for the radio, including a guest appearance in the BBC Radio 4 series Baldi.

In 2001, he played Captain Stickles in the BBC adaptation of R. D. Blackmore's Lorna Doone. In 2002, Clunes played serial killer John George Haigh in a Yorkshire TV production A Is for Acid, and took the lead in ITV's production of Goodbye, Mr. Chips. Clunes was one of the eponymous leads in the 2004 ITV comedy-drama William and Mary, with Julie Graham. Clunes had worked with Julie Graham previously on Dirty Tricks (2000). From 2004 until the conclusion in 2022 Clunes played the lead role of Dr Martin Ellingham in the ITV comedy drama series Doc Martin. In August 2007, Clunes starred in the ITV/TVNZ co-production The Man Who Lost His Head.

Clunes is a regular voice-over artist and is the voice of Kipper in the animated children's series Kipper the Dog, and Stripy in Little Robots, another animated children's series. For six years (1993–1999) he also did voice acting for Safeway adverts; he provided the voice of Harry in Safeway's 'When Harry Met Molly' advertising campaign during said years. Clunes appeared in a television dramatisation of Fungus the Bogeyman playing Jessica White's father. Between 2009 and 2010, Clunes starred on BBC One television in the title role of Reggie Perrin, a re-make of classic 1970s British situation comedy The Fall and Rise of Reginald Perrin. In 2015, Clunes played the role of Sir Arthur Conan Doyle in the ITV mini-series Arthur & George. In 2018, Clunes played the role of DCI Colin Sutton in the ITV drama Manhunt (first screened in 2019). In 2019, Clunes returned to sitcom with the BBC1 series Warren, saying "It was just so funny, I couldn't turn it down". In 2025, Clunes played the part of a farmer affected by County Lines drug gangs on a Welsh farm in the ITV drama Out There.

=== Film ===
Clunes played Brock in the 1990 film The Russia House. He played a character called Martin in the 1992 film Carry On Columbus; Richard Burbage in the 1998 film Shakespeare in Love; and Anthony Staxton-Billing in Sweet Revenge the same year. In 2000, Clunes played the role of Dr. Martin Bamford in the film Saving Grace, and the follow-up to that film Doc Martin the following year (2001), he played James Chancellor in Global Heresy.

In 2011, Clunes voiced the mischievous dog Dudley in the short film Me or the Dog, starring Edward Hogg and directed by Abner Pastoll. Clunes then starred in the 2014 film Nativity 3: Dude, Where's My Donkey?.

=== Documentaries ===
In 2008, Clunes presented Martin Clunes: A Man and his Dogs, which was aired on 24 August 2008. In 2009, Clunes presented a three-part ITV series Islands of Britain, which saw him travelling around several of the country's lesser known islands. In 2010 Clunes presented ITV mini-series Horsepower about man's relationship over time with the horse. This was followed by Heavy Horsepower which aired in 2013. In January 2011, Clunes presented documentary Martin Clunes: Man to Manta. In June 2012, Clunes presented a documentary series on ITV about the lemurs of Madagascar called Martin Clunes: The Lemurs of Madagascar.

On 31 January 2013, Clunes narrated ITV documentary Secret Life of Dogs. Then, on 2 and 3 June 2014, he narrated two more follow-up documentaries, Secret Life of Cats and Secret Life of Babies. On 4 April 2014 Clunes hosted a one-off ITV documentary called Martin Clunes & A Lion Called Mugie, following the work of conservationists in Kenya as well as tracking the progress of a lion called Mugie. The documentary was filmed over three years. In August 2014 Clunes narrated ITV's three-part documentary series Kids with Cameras: Diary of a Children's Ward which saw Newcastle's children's ward through the eyes of its patients. In April 2015, Clunes narrated Carry on Forever, a three part documentary series for ITV3. It was shown over the Easter weekend.

In May 2015, Clunes presented Man & Beast with Martin Clunes, a two-part factual series for ITV, which looked at the relationship between humans and animals. In 2016, he narrated Rising Damp Forever, a two-part documentary series for ITV3. He also voiced ITV programmes Secrets of Growing Old, Secrets of Growing Up and Britain's Favourite Dogs. Also in 2016, Martin Clunes: Islands of Australia (also known as Islands of Oz) was released as a three-part Australian documentary television series produced by Prospero Productions for the Seven Network that "follows acclaimed actor and comedian Martin Clunes as he explores the most diverse, intriguing, remote and spectacular islands that surround Australia."

In 2019, Martin Clunes: Islands of America was released as a four-part documentary where he travelled to remote islands that are part of the United States.

== Personal life ==
Clunes's first marriage was to actress Lucy Aston in 1990. They divorced in 1997 and Clunes married future Doc Martin producer Philippa Braithwaite later that year. In 1999, Braithwaite gave birth to their daughter. Clunes and his family live in Beaminster, Dorset, where they run a farm with heavy horses.

== Philanthropy ==
A sponsor of numerous charities, Clunes made a short on-line film with Stephen Fry about HIV discrimination for the Terrence Higgins Trust.

Since 1 June 2011, Clunes has occupied the role of President of the British Horse Society.

Clunes supports Weldmar Hospicecare Trust in Dorset and is a Patron of Julia's House, the Dorset and Wiltshire children's hospice. The Buckham Fair is organised in support of these charities. In January 2011, Clunes became a patron of Animal Care in Egypt (ACE).

Clunes was a patron of the Born Free Foundation, and had filmed several adverts for the charity. However, he was dropped by the foundation in May 2019, after he was filmed riding an elephant in an episode of the ITV documentary series My Travels with Other Animals. He has also been involved in the Comic Relief charity which funds Survival International and African Initiatives, two organisations working with the Maasai on indigenous land rights issues. He is a supporter of The Dog Rescue Federation.

== Filmography ==
=== Film ===
Year	Title	Role	Awards	Notes
1990	The Russia House	Brock		Film debut
1992	Carry On Columbus	Martin		
1993	Dancing Queen	Donald		
1993	Swing Kids	Bannführer		
1994	Staggered	Neil Price		Also director
1998	The Acid House	Rory		
1998	Shakespeare in Love	Richard Burbage		
1998	The Revengers' Comedies (a.k.a. Sweet Revenge)	Anthony Staxton-Billing		
1999	Sex n' Death	Ben Black		
2000	Saving Grace	Martin Bamford		
2002	Global Heresy	James Chancellor		
2014	Nativity 3: Dude, Where's My Donkey?	Jeremy Shepherd		
2026	Wuthering Heights	Mr. Earnshaw		
2026	Mother's Pride	Mick		
TBA	Black Palace †	—N/a		Post-production

=== Television ===
Year	Title	Role	Notes
1982	The White Guard	Unknown	
1983	Doctor Who	Lon	Serial: Snakedance
1983–86	No Place Like Home	Nigel Crabtree	
1986–87	All at No 20	Henry	
1990	Never Come Back	Luke	
1990–94	Harry Enfield's Television Programme	Various characters	
1991	Jeeves and Wooster	Barmy Fotheringay Phipps	
1992	Inspector Morse	James Balcombe	S6 E2 "Happy Families"
1992–98	Men Behaving Badly	Gary Strang	British Comedy Award for Top TV Comedy Actor (1995); BAFTA Award for Best Comedy Performance (1996)
1993	Demob	Dick Dobson	
1993	Lovejoy	Anthony Drury	
1994	Under the Hammer	Hector Bovington	
1994	Have I Got News for You	Guest presenter/panellist	
1995	Moving Story	Earl Pangbourne	
1996	Over Here	RAF Commanding Officer	
1996–2000	Roger and the Rottentrolls	Narrator	
1997–2000	Kipper	Kipper (voice)	
1998	Touch and Go	Nick Wood	TV film
1998	Neville's Island	Angus	TV film
1999	Hunting Venus	Simon Delancy	TV film
2001	Merlin the Magical Puppy	Merlin (voice)	TV film
2002	Goodbye, Mr. Chips	Mr. Chipping	TV film
2002	A Is for Acid	John Haigh	TV film
2003	Doc Martin and the Legend of the Cloutie	Martin Bamford	TV film
2003–05	William and Mary	William Shawcross	
2003–05	Little Robots	Stripy Robot (voice)	
2004	Fungus the Bogeyman	George White	TV serial
2004–22	Doc Martin	Martin Ellingham	British Comedy Award for Best TV Comedy Drama (2004)
2006	Losing It	Phil MacNaughton	TV film
2007	The Man Who Lost His Head	Ian Bennett	TV film
2008	Martin Clunes: A Man and His Dogs	Presenter	
2009	Islands of Britain	Presenter	Three-part series
2009–10	Reggie Perrin	Reginald "Reggie" Perrin	
2010	Martin Clunes: Horsepower	Presenter	Mini series
2011	Martin Clunes: Man to Manta	Presenter	
2012	Martin Clunes: The Lemurs of Madagascar	Presenter	Mini series
2012	A Mother's Son	Ben	
2012	The Town	Len Robson	
2012	Room on the Broom	Dog (voice)	
2013	Strike Back: Shadow Warfare	Sebastian Grey	
2013	Martin Clunes: Heavy Horsepower	Presenter	One-off episode
2013–17	Secret Life of	Narrator	
2014	Kids with Cameras: Diary of a Children's Ward	Narrator	Three-part series
2014	Martin Clunes & A Lion Called Mugie	Presenter	One-off episode
2015	Arthur & George	Arthur Conan Doyle	Drama series
2015	Carry On Forever	Narrator	Three-part series
2015	Man & Beast with Martin Clunes	Presenter	Two-part series
2016	Rising Damp Forever	Narrator	Two-part series
2016	Secrets of Growing Old	Narrator	One-off episode
2016	Secrets of Growing Up	Narrator	One-off episode
2016	Britain's Favourite Dogs	Narrator	One-off episode
2016	Les Dawson Forever	Narrator	Two-part series
2017	Martin Clunes: Islands of Australia	Presenter	Mini series
2017	Morecambe & Wise Forever	Narrator	Two-part series
2017	Tommy Cooper Forever	Narrator	Two-part series
2018	Vanity Fair	Sir Pitt Crawley	Drama series
2019–2021	Manhunt	DCI Colin Sutton	Drama series
2019	Martin Clunes: Islands of America	Presenter	Four part series
2019	Warren	Warren Thompson	Sitcom
2021	Scotland: Escape to the Wilderness	Himself	Episode one of series
2022	Farewell to Doc Martin	Himself	One-off special
2022, 2024	Martin Clunes Islands of the Pacific	Himself	Two series; six episodes
2023	Mel Giedroyc & Martin Clunes Explore Britain by the Book	Himself	One-off travelogue special with Mel Giedroyc
2023	Martin Clunes: A Dog Called Laura	Himself	One-off documentary
2025	Out There	Nathan	
2025	Neil & Martin’s Bon Voyage	Himself	Travelogue miniseries with Neil Morrissey
2025	Martin Clunes: Islands of the Atlantic	Himself	Travelogue mini series
2026	Power: The Downfall of Huw Edwards	Huw Edwards	Docudrama film
2026	Best Medicine	Robert Best	Season 1 episode 9 "Doc Martin"

== Bibliography ==
- A Dog's Life (Hodder & Stoughton, 2009) ISBN 9780340977057
- Meetings With Remarkable Animals (Penguin, 2024) ISBN 9780241723784

== Awards and honours ==
- 1995 – British Comedy Awards, Top TV Comedy Actor : Men Behaving Badly – Gary Strang
- 1996 – British Academy Television Awards, Best Comedy Performance : Men Behaving Badly – Gary Strang
- 1999 – Screen Actors Guild Awards, Outstanding Performance by a Cast : Shakespeare in Love – Richard Burbage

Clunes was made an Officer of the Order of the British Empire (OBE) in the Civil Division on 13 June 2015 in the 2015 Queen's Birthday Honours List. He was appointed as a Deputy Lieutenant (DL) of the County of Dorset on 19 June 2019.

Bournemouth University awarded him the honorary degree of Doctor of Arts (D.Arts) on 9 November 2007. He has been president of the British Horse Society since 1 June 2011.

In 2024, Clunes was named as the inaugural Chancellor for Hartpury University and Hartpury College.
