= Charles Stuart Parker =

British academic, writer and politician

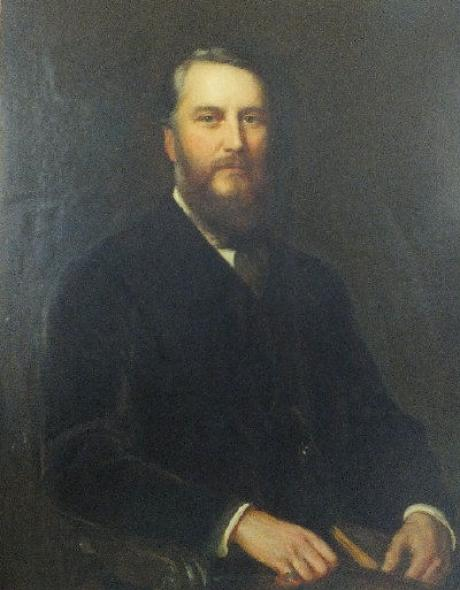
Charles Stuart Parker, 1884 portrait

Charles Stuart Parker (1 June 1829 – 18 June 1910) was a British academic, writer and Liberal politician.

== Early life and background ==
Parker was the eldest son of Charles Stewart Parker (1800–1868), merchant, of Aigburth, Liverpool, and Fairlie, Ayrshire, and his wife, Anne Sandbach, daughter of Samuel Sandbach. His father was in business with George Rainy; Rainy was an uncle, a son of the Rev. George Rainy of Creich, Sutherland, whose daughter Mary Rainy had married Charles Stewart Parker (also Steuart) the elder (died 1828).

When the British government emancipated the slaves in the 1830s, Charles Stewart Parker was compensated for over 400 slaves he shared ownership of on 16 estates in British Guiana.

The barrister and judge James Parker was his uncle. His aunt Annie Parker married in 1838 the politician Edward Cardwell.

== Education and career ==
Parker was educated at Eton College. He matriculated at Brasenose College, Oxford in 1847. In 1848 he moved to University College with a scholarship. He graduated B.A. there in 1852. After obtaining a first class degree he became a fellow of his college in 1854. From 1857 he gave private tuition to T. H. Green of Balliol College, helping Green to his First in Greats in 1859. He was a public examiner at Oxford in 1859, 1860, 1863, and 1868. From 1864 to 1868 he was Private Secretary to Edward Cardwell when he was Secretary of State for the Colonies.

== In politics ==
At the 1868 general election, Parker was elected as the Member of Parliament (MP) for Perthshire. He was a member of the Royal Commission on Military Education from 1869 to 1870, and of the Scottish Endowed Schools Commission from 1872 to 1874, and was one of the Special Commissioners for Public Schools. Parker lost his Perthshire seat at the 1874 general election. In it, his Conservative opponent Sir William Stirling-Maxwell, 9th Baronet had accused both Parker and W. E. Gladstone of being "closet Catholics".

Parker was returned the House of Commons as MP for Perth at a by-election in January 1878, and held the seat until 1892. He was chairman of referees on Private Bills in the 1885 parliament. In 1892 he stood again in Perth, despite opposition from the local Liberal Association. He had the support of Gladstone, but as a "moderate Liberal of the old school" he was not acceptable to more radical voters. The Conservative William Whitelaw won, after the independent candidate James Woollen was backed by the Perth Liberal and Radical Association formed around 1891, with a grievance from 1885 against Parker's approval of "reactionary policies". In 1900 he stood against the Liberal Unionist successor to Donald Currie, John Stroyan at West Perthshire, but lost.

== Works ==
=== Biographical ===
Parker collated and published the papers of Sir Robert Peel in three volumes, 1891–1899. He had Gladstone's help with letters, but Colin Matthew writes about issues with "rapid transcription". Peel's literary executors were Viscount Mahon and Edward Cardwell; efforts to have Goldwin Smith write an official biography fell flat. Cardwell and Parker eventually undertook a work based on the papers. Arthur Wellesley Peel, the Prime Minister's youngest son, favoured a slant by which Peel was shown as a precursor of Gladstone.

He also published the Life and Letters of Sir James Graham, 2nd Baronet in 1907 (2 vols.)

=== Reform and education ===
In the aftermath of the Reform Act 1867, Parker published two essays on education. One, "Popular Education", was in Questions for a Reformed Parliament (1867), a collection of ten pieces which announced itself in the preface as a sequel to Essays on Reform from earlier in the year. The other, "On the history of classical education", appeared in Frederic William Farrar's Essays on a Liberal Education. In a later edition of his Essays on Educational Reformers (first edition 1868), Robert Hebert Quick praised Parker's account of Johannes Sturm. An 1876 survey on "English Pedagogy" drawn from the American Journal of Education commented on how that, for his history, Parker had drawn on Friedrich Ludwig Georg von Raumer and the Geschichte der Pädagogik of Karl Schmidt.

For the 1874 annual meeting of the National Association for the Promotion of Social Science in Glasgow, Parker contributed a paper on "Academical Endowments".

== Fairlie House ==
Parker resided at Fairlie House in Ayrshire, which had been built in 1818 by his grandfather, Charles Stewart Parker the elder, and then belonged to his uncle George Parker (1806–1860). (This house was at coastal Fairlie, now in North Ayrshire, near Fairlie Castle; it was not the inland five-chimneyed Fairlie House on the Fairlie Estate, near Old Rome, now in South Ayrshire.)

== Death and legacy ==
Charles Stuart Parker died unmarried in London at 32 Old Queen Street, aged 81. He was buried at Fairlie.

Fairlie House passed to his nephew Charles Sandbach Parker, son of his brother Samuel Sandbach Parker (1837–1905) by his first wife Mary Isabella Gore Booth. Charles Sandbach Parker (1864–1920) was an Oxford graduate and partner in Sandbach, Tinne & Co., and a Liberal Unionist political candidate in 1910 and 1911.

== Climbing ==
With his two brothers Samuel Sandbach Parker and Alfred Traill Parker (1837–1900), Parker was a pioneer of guideless climbing, i.e. climbs without a mountain guide. He used to climb with William Henry Gladstone, and Henry Cotton recalled meeting them on the Eggishorn. He was a family friend of the Gladstones, visiting them at Hawarden.

Parliament of the United Kingdom
Preceded by Sir William Stirling-Maxwell	Member of Parliament for Perthshire; 1868 – 1874	Succeeded by Sir William Stirling-Maxwell
Preceded by Arthur Kinnaird	Member of Parliament for Perth; 1878 – 1892	Succeeded by William Whitelaw
