= West Perthshire (UK Parliament constituency) =

Parliamentary constituency in the United Kingdom, 1885–1918

Western Perthshire
- Former county constituency for the House of Commons
- Subdivisions of Scotland: Perthshire

1885–1918
- Seats: One
- Created from: Perthshire
- Replaced by: Kinross & West Perthshire

West (or Western) Perthshire was a county constituency of the House of Commons of the Parliament of the United Kingdom from 1885 to 1918. It elected one Member of Parliament (MP) by the first-past-the-post voting system.

== Boundaries ==
The constituency was defined by the Redistribution of Seats Act 1885, by dividing the Perthshire constituency to form two new constituencies which were first used in the 1885 general election. The other new constituency was East Perthshire. Together with the burgh constituency of Perth, which was unaltered, these constituencies covered the county of Perth, except that five detached parishes had been merged into the Clackmannanshire and Kinross-shire constituency by the Representation of the People (Scotland) Act 1832.

As defined in the 1885 Act, the constituency consisted of the "Parishes of Aberfoyle, Ardoch, Auchterarder, Blair Atholl, Balquhidder, Blackford, Crieff, Comrie, Callander, Dunkeld and Dowally (except so much as is comprised in Division No. 1 as herein described), Dunblane, Dull, Fortingall, Fowlis Wester, Glendevon, Kenmore, Killin, Kilmadock, Kincardine, Kippen (except the detached part locally situate in Stirlingshire), Kirkmichael, Little Dunkeld, Logierait, Lecropt, Moulin, Madderty, Monzie, Monzievaird and Strowan, Muthill, Port of Menteith, Trinity Gask, and Weem."

1885 boundaries were used also in the general elections of 1886, 1892, 1895, 1900, 1906, January 1910 and December 1910.

By 1918, throughout most of Scotland, county boundaries had been altered, and detached parishes were generally historic. The Representation of the People Act 1918 took account of new local government boundaries and grouped the county of Perth with the county of Kinross for parliamentary representation purposes. Therefore, for the 1918 general election, the two counties were covered by the Perth constituency, which was now a county constituency, entirely within the county of Perth, and the Kinross and West Perthshire constituency, which covered the county of Kinross and part of the county of Perth.

== Members of Parliament ==
Election	Member	Party
1885	Sir Donald Currie, previously MP for Perthshire	Liberal
1886	Sir Donald Currie, previously MP for Perthshire	Liberal Unionist
1900	John Stroyan	Liberal Unionist
1906	David Charles Erskine	Liberal
January 1910	John Stewart-Murray, Marquess of Tullibardine	Conservative
1917 by-election	Archibald Stirling	Unionist
1918	constituency abolished	

== Election results ==
Decades:	1880s; 1890s; 1900s; 1910s

=== Elections in the 1880s ===
1885 general election: West Perthshire
Party	Candidate	Votes	%	±%
Liberal	Donald Currie	3,786	53.5	
Conservative	Henry Home-Drummond-Moray	3,290	46.5	
Majority		496	7.0	
Turnout		7,076	85.4	
Registered electors		8,284		
Liberal win (new seat)				

1886 general election: West Perthshire
Party	Candidate	Votes	%	±%
Liberal Unionist	Donald Currie	3,269	58.4	+11.9
Liberal	George William Thompson Omond	2,329	41.6	−11.9
Majority		940	16.8	N/A
Turnout		5,598	67.6	−17.8
Registered electors		8,284		
Liberal Unionist gain from Liberal		Swing	+11.9	

=== Elections in the 1890s ===
Ure

1892 general election: West Perthshire
Party	Candidate	Votes	%	±%
Liberal Unionist	Donald Currie	3,422	52.8	−5.6
Liberal	Alexander Ure	3,053	47.2	+5.6
Majority		369	5.6	−11.2
Turnout		6,475	81.3	+13.7
Registered electors		7,966		
Liberal Unionist hold		Swing	-5.6	

Hope

1895 general election: West Perthshire
Party	Candidate	Votes	%	±%
Liberal Unionist	Donald Currie	3,379	52.3	−0.5
Liberal	John Hope	3,087	47.7	+0.5
Majority		292	4.6	−1.0
Turnout		6,466	81.0	−0.3
Registered electors		7,984		
Liberal Unionist hold		Swing	-0.5	

=== Elections in the 1900s ===
1900 general election: West Perthshire
Party	Candidate	Votes	%	±%
Liberal Unionist	John Stroyan	3,598	55.3	+3.0
Liberal	Charles Stuart Parker	2,913	44.7	−3.0
Majority		685	10.6	+6.0
Turnout		6,511	80.6	−0.4
Registered electors		8,078		
Liberal Unionist hold		Swing	+3.0	

1906 general election: West Perthshire
Party	Candidate	Votes	%	±%
Liberal	David Charles Erskine	3,890	55.8	+11.1
Liberal Unionist	John Stroyan	3,087	44.2	−11.1
Majority		803	11.6	N/A
Turnout		6,977	83.0	+2.4
Registered electors		8,401		
Liberal gain from Liberal Unionist		Swing	+11.1	

=== Elections in the 1910s ===
Morison

January 1910 general election: West Perthshire
Party	Candidate	Votes	%	±%
Conservative	John Stewart-Murray	3,864	52.0	+7.8
Liberal	Thomas Morison	3,566	48.0	−7.8
Majority		298	4.0	N/A
Turnout		7,430	86.9	+3.9
Registered electors		8,547		
Conservative gain from Liberal		Swing	+7.8	

December 1910 general election: West Perthshire
Party	Candidate	Votes	%	±%
Conservative	John Stewart-Murray	4,027	52.5	+0.5
Liberal	George Freeland Barbour	3,637	47.5	−0.5
Majority		390	5.0	+1.0
Turnout		7,664	87.9	+1.0
Registered electors		8,715		
Conservative hold		Swing	+0.5	

General Election 1914–15:

Another General Election was required to take place before the end of 1915. The political parties had been making preparations for an election to take place and by July 1914, the following candidates had been selected;

- Liberal: Kenneth McIver

By-election, 1917: West Perthshire
Party	Candidate	Votes	%	±%
Unionist	Archibald Stirling	Unopposed		
Unionist hold				
