= Guillamon =

Guillamon or Guillamón may refer to:

- Guillamon Island, Highland, Scotland
- Costa y Guillamón, La Paz, Canelones Department, Uruguay

== People ==
- Hugo Guillamón (born 2000), Spanish professional footballer
- Antoine Guillamon (born 1991), French rugby union player
- Juan Carlos Guillamón (born 1974), Spanish cyclist
- Julià Guillamon (born 1962), Spanish writer and literary critic
- Vicente Alejandro Guillamón (born 1930), Spanish journalist and writer
