= Sandbach, Tinne & Company =

Sugar, coffee, slave, and rum trader

- Type: Trading company
- Industry: Trade
- Founded: 1782
- Founder: James McInroy, Charles Stuart Parker, Samuel Sandbach
- Defunct: 1975
- Headquarters: Glasgow, Liverpool
- Key people: Philip Frederick Tinne, George Rainy
- Products: Sugar, coffee, rum, molasses

Sandbach, Tinne & Company, together with its associate firms McInroy, Parker & Company and McInroy, Sandbach & Company, was a business whose roots can be traced back to 1782. Having begun business in the cotton trade, the firms moved into sugar products and exported coffee, molasses, rum and sugar from the European colonies in the Caribbean. They owned ships and plantations, and engaged in both the trafficking enslaved people and transport of indentured labour.

== Formation ==
The origins of Sandbach, Tinne & Company, together with its related firms, can be traced to James McInroy, a Scot from near Pitlochry who was trading on the British colony of Grenada from 1782. Another of the original partners was Charles Stuart Parker, who arrived in Grenada to work as a clerk for his uncle, merchant George Robertson, in 1789. These men, too, were of Scots origin and within months of Parker's arrival arrangements were being made for them to form a trading partnership with a third Scotsman, a Mr Gordon. That partnership began operations in 1790 but soon hit difficulties as both uncle and nephew became upset with Gordon's behaviour. Gordon ceased to be a partner and McInroy joined them while continuing also independently to operate a business in the Dutch colony of Demerara. In 1792, the partnership was expanded to include Samuel Sandbach, an Englishman who had arrived in Grenada in 1788 to work for his uncle, who shared the same name and was also an established merchant there. Sandbach had gravitated to being a clerk for the McInroy, Parker and Robertson partnership and had impressed them so much that they invited him to join their firm on an equal standing.

The firm was initially involved in exporting the slave produced commodities of cotton and coffee, and in importing manufactured goods from Britain McInroy had set up a store in Demerara in 1790 and was using ships to trade between there and Grenada. Although the partnership owned at least two slave plantations producing cotton in Demerara, it was the success of the store that became the most significant aspect of the new enterprise and it resulted in Parker and Robertson returning to Britain to develop business contacts. The two men set sail in haste for Grenada in 1795 when they heard news that the combination of a French landing on the island and an uprising by Afro-Grenadians, Fedon's rebellion, there was threatening British rule. McInroy managed to escape the island with around £9000 in goods by using the partnership's sail boat, a sloop, called Rambler, which then evaded a close-fought boarding attempt by a French privateer.

The partners reconvened in Demerara but trade became difficult in the following months and it was insufficient to support all four men. While McInroy and Sandbach concentrated on the trading aspect and eventually formed the Demerara-based firm of McInroy, Sandbach & Company in 1801, Parker and Robertson went to live on and develop one cotton plantation each. Robertson died in 1799, two years after Parker had returned to Scotland and married Margaret Rainy, a niece of Robertson. Parker went back to Demerara to oversee business.

McInroy, Parker and Sandbach all returned to Britain in 1801, after the foundation of the Demerara firm. Once there, they established in Glasgow the firm of McInroy, Parker & Company as the Scottish arm of their venture. A year later, they formed another branch in Liverpool, the main slave-trading port in England, where Sandbach moved around the time that he married Elizabeth Robertson in December. Elizabeth was another of George Robertson's nieces. William McBean, another Scot, joined the Demerara partnership in 1803 but had left by around 1808 and subsequently became a partner with Robert Kingston.

In 1813, the prosperous and well-connected Philip Frederick Tinne, a Dutchman of Huguenot descent who already had experience of working coffee plantations in Demerara, joined the firm in Liverpool as a full partner.

== Activities ==
Having begun in the cotton trade, the partners changed course and became involved in production of sugar from around 1810. The firms became known as the "Rothchilds of Demerara". The enterprise grew to become owners of both ships and plantations and also exporters of coffee, molasses, rum and sugar from the West Indies to the British ports of Liverpool and Glasgow. They were significant slave owners. When chattel slavery was abolished, in 1833, they were the largest owner of plantations and slaves in what was by then British Guiana, the provisions for compensation to slave owners made under the terms of the Slavery Abolition Act 1833 resulted in a payment of £150,452 to Sandbach, Tinne & Company. The compensation was the second-largest payment made to any mercantile concern. (Note: The comparative purchasing power of £150,452 in 2015 was £12.9 million.)

From the 1830s until the 1920s were major transporters of indentured labour and new research indicates they may have continued trafficking enslaved Africans to the colonies after the Slavery Abolition Act. The latter became a feature of society in British Guiana following emancipation of enslaved Africans because plantation owners wanted a new source of cheap labour and they found it in the importation of people from India.

The name of the Demerara firm was changed from McInroy, Sandbach & Co. to Sandbach, Parker & Co. in 1861. The firm, which continued its interests in shipping and sugar, was wound up and held its last meeting in London in 1975.

== Flag ==
The distinctive crest used by the firms may owe its origin to the incident with the Rambler which, sailing without a flag and being threatened with boarding, improvised a solution by sewing together a white shirt between the legs of a pair of blue trousers. The letters "STC" were added at a later date.

== Families ==
The business relationships were to entwined by marriage. Not only were two of the founding partners married to nieces of a third such partner, Robertson, but the son of Parker married a daughter of Sandbach. Another daughter of Sandbach married John Abraham Tinne, a son of Philip Tinne. Sandbach and Tinne lived next-door to each other for some time, at 27 and 29 St Anne Street, Liverpool, from where they had a good view of shipping on the River Mersey.

George Rainy, a nephew of Robertson and brother of Parker's wife, also became a partner and was the main representative in Demerara from around 1808 to 1837, when he returned to Britain. Other notable relations of the four founding partners include Charles Stuart Parker and Emily Tinne.

When Sandbach formally left the partnership in November 1833, having by that time been mayor of Liverpool, two of his sons took over his interest in the firms. James McInroy had died in 1825; his son, James Patrick McInroy, was also a partner in Sandbach, Tinne & Co. The involvement of the founding families continued thereafter and around 1900 the partners included John Ernest Tinne (1845-1925), Charles Sandbach Parker (1864-1920), Evelyn Stuart Parker (1870-1936), and John Abraham Tinne (1877-1933).

Historian Nicholas Draper notes that "At least ten family members featured among the richest people in Britain on their deaths, spanning more than a century".

== See also ==
- Colonial molasses trade
