= D. Alan Stevenson =

Scottish civil engineer (1891–1971)

- Born: 7 February 1891
- Died: 22 December 1971 (aged 80); Edinburgh, Scotland
- Education: University of Edinburgh
- Occupations: engineer, architect
- Employer: Northern Lighthouse Board
- Spouse: Jessie MacLaggan
- Parent(s): Charles Alexander Stevenson (father); Margaret Sherriff (mother)

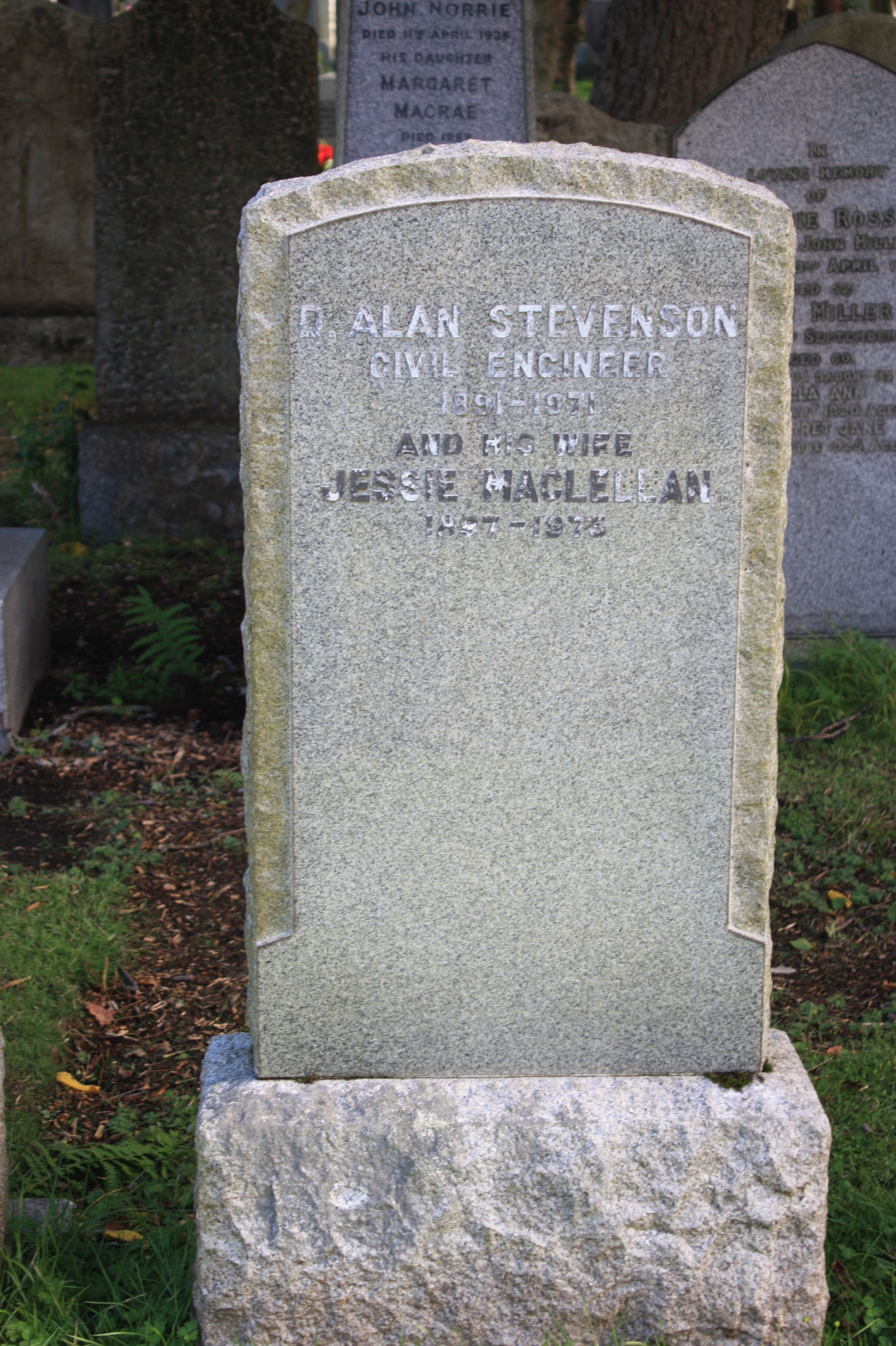
The grave of David Alan Stevenson, Dean Cemetery, Edinburgh

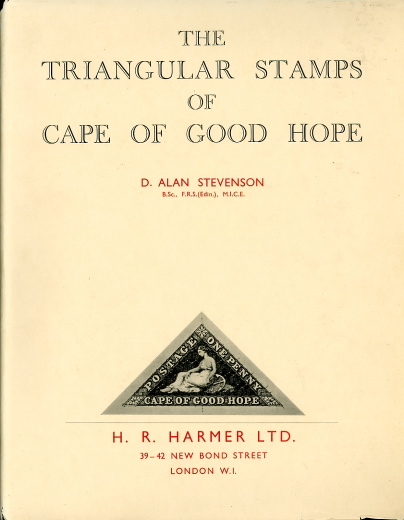
Stevenson's 1950 book The Triangular Stamps of Cape of Good Hope.

David Alan Stevenson (7 February 1891 – 22 December 1971) was a lighthouse engineer from the famous Stevenson lighthouse-builder family and noted amateur philatelist.

In 1951, Stevenson was awarded the Crawford Medal by the Royal Philatelic Society London for his work The Triangular Stamps of Cape of Good Hope.

== Life ==
He was born at 9 Manor Place on 7 February 1891, the son of Margaret Sherriff and Charles Alexander Stevenson. He was the last of a long line of lighthouse engineers. He was named after his uncle, David Alan Stevenson but was generally called Alan. The family lived at 9 Manor Place in Edinburgh's West End. He was educated at Edinburgh Academy 1899 to 1903, then studied civil engineering at the University of Edinburgh, graduating with a BSc in 1912.

In 1911, he was living with his family at 28 Douglas Crescent.

In World War I, he served as a captain in the Royal Marines as an engineer. His duties included setting guidance lights on the Dardanelles to aid shipping there.

In 1919, he was elected as a Fellow of the Royal Society of Edinburgh. His proposers were Charles Alexander Stevenson (his father), David Alan Stevenson (his uncle), William A. P. Tait, James Simpson Pirie, Sir Thomas Hudson Beare and Harry Rainy.

Until 1938, he was an engineer of the Northern Lighthouse Board and thereafter spent his life working for the Clyde Lighthouse Trust. His work on the Clyde was pre-empted in 1934 by a commission to deepen the river in order to have capacity to launch the RMS Queen Mary.

He died on 22 December 1971 and was buried in the first northern extension to Dean Cemetery in western Edinburgh. The grave lies immediately alongside his parents.

== Family ==
He was married to Jessie MacLaggan (1897–1973).

== Family tree ==
Alan's position in the family tree shows his long pedigree as an engineer.

Robert Stevenson engineering family tree

Thomas Smith (engineer)	Jean Lille Stevenson
Joan Smith
David Stevenson (engineer)	Alan Stevenson (engineer)
Charles Alexander Stevenson (engineer)	David Alan Stevenson (engineer)
D. Alan Stevenson (engineer)

Alan Stevenson (merchant)
Robert Stevenson (civil engineer)
Thomas Stevenson (engineer)
Robert Louis Stevenson

== Selected publications ==
- The Triangular Stamps of Cape of Good Hope (New York, London, Sydney: H.R. Harmer, 1950)
- The World's Lighthouses before 1820 (1959)
