= Clan Maxton =

Scottish clan

Crest badge appropriate for members of Clan Maxton.

Coat of arms of the last chief of Maxton, the Maxton of Cultoquhey

Clan Maxton is a Scottish clan. The clan does not have a chief recognised by the Lord Lyon King of Arms therefore the clan has no standing under Scots Law.

Clan Maxton is considered an armigerous clan, meaning that it is considered to have had at one time a chief who possessed the chiefly arms, or who was considered chief of the name. However no one at present is in possession of such arms, and no one is considered chief of the name.

== Origins ==
=== Border Clan ===
The surname Maxton is considered to be a habitational name from the lands and barony of Maxton in Roxburghshire, on the Scottish Borders. The name roughly means "settlement (tun) of Maccus".

Around 1153, during the reign of David I, Maccus, son of Undwin is thought to have obtained the lands. The family however are thought to have lost their lands, which passed into the possession of Robert de Berkley in the 12th century.

In 1261, Adam de Maxton was elected Abbot of Melrose. He may be the same Alexander de Maxton, who was styled "constable of Roxburgh", and the individual who is recorded as submitting to Edward I, king of England, on the Ragman Rolls in 1296.

In around 1410, Robert de Maxton received the lands of Cultoquhey near Crieff in Perthshire. This man's coat of arms may allude to the earlier Abbot of Melrose, as they bear three crosses. Robert Maxton died at the Battle of Flodden in 1513.

=== Alliances and marriages ===
The clan prospered in Perthshire, allying themselves by marriages to other clans such as the Oliphants and the Grahams of Balgowan and of Grahams Murrayshall. In 1859, James Maxton of Cultoquhey succeeded his uncle Robert Graham of Balgowan and since then the Maxtons of Cultoquhey borne the double-barrelled surname Maxtone-Graham and quartered the arms of both families.

== See also ==
- Maxton (disambiguation)
