= Maxton =

Maxton is a placename and a surname. It may refer to:

Places:

- Maxton, Kent, England
- Maxton, Michigan
- Maxton, North Carolina
- Maxton, Roxburghshire, Scotland

People:

- Annie Maxton, Scottish socialist and trade unionist
- Graeme Maxton, Scottish-born author and economist
- James Maxton (1885–1946), Scottish socialist politician
- John Maxton, Baron Maxton (1936–2025), Scottish politician
- Julie Maxton, New Zealand lawyer and academic

Other:

- Clan Maxton, a Scottish clan

== See also ==
- Laurinburg-Maxton Airport
- Maxthon
