= Isabella Rudkin =

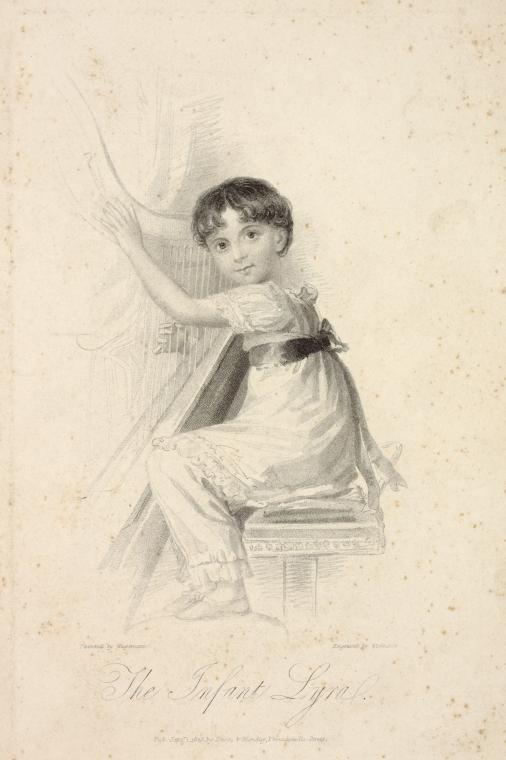

Background information
- Also known as: The Infant Lyra
- Born: c.1821/3 Dublin, United Kingdom of Great Britain and Ireland
- Died: October 1888 London, England
- Occupation: musician
- Instrument: harp
- Years active: 1824–1827

Isabella "Issie" Rudkin (born c.1821/3 – 1888) was an Anglo-Irish child musical prodigy known as "The Infant Lyra." She played the harp.

== Life ==
Rudkin was born in Dublin, and was the daughter of Henry Rudkin JP and Arabella Sacksville (née Cotter). In June 1824, she was claimed to be "3 years 8 months old", but later family accounts claimed that she was born in 1823.

By the age of sixteen months Rudkin could sing a wide selection of melodies and she was composing from the age of 2 and a half. She sometimes performed with her mother and siblings, and could play compositions including "My Love is but a Lassie yet" and a "March to the air of St. Patrick's Day with Variations."

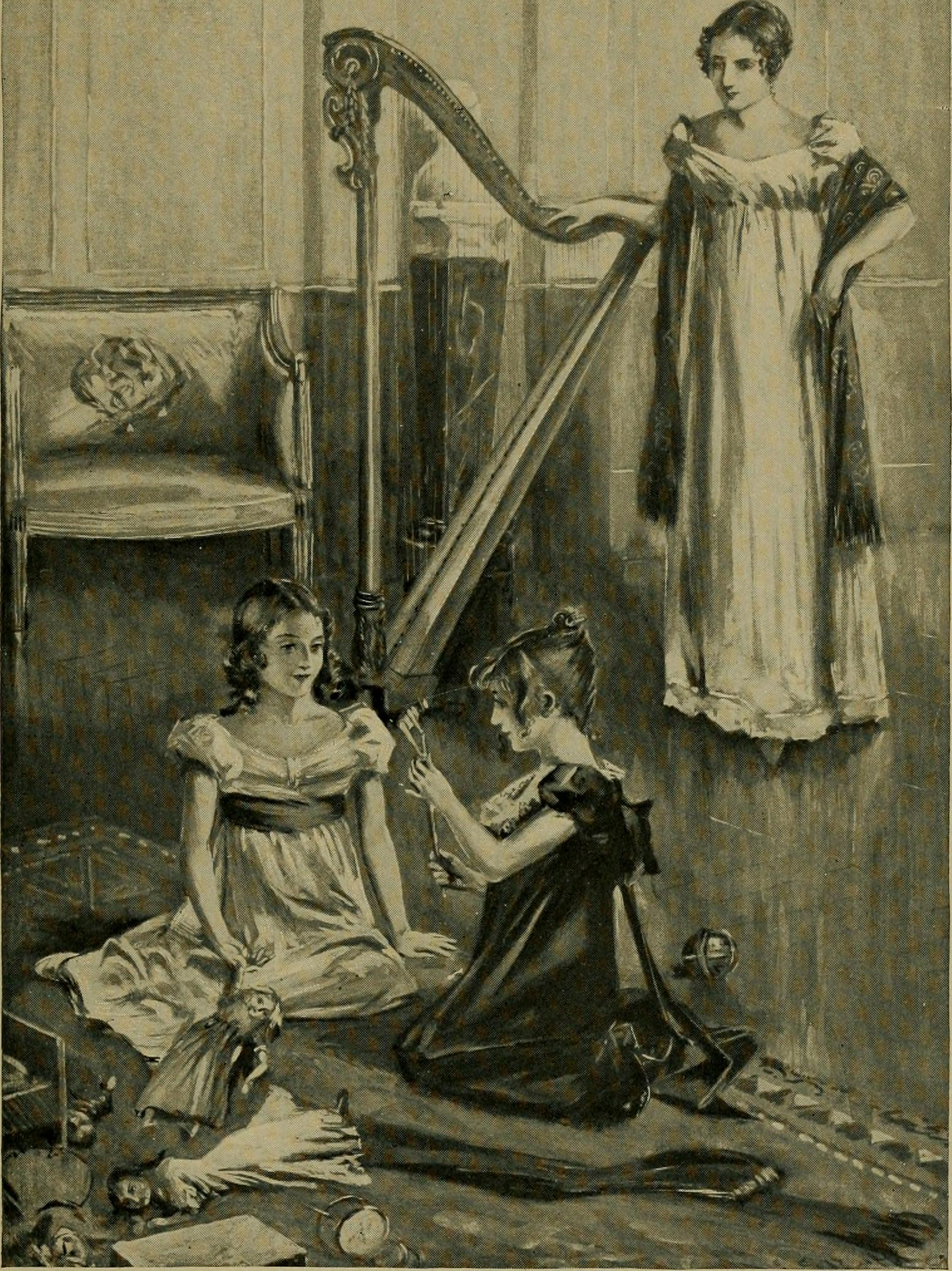
The Infant Lyra with Queen Victoria, from the book V. R. I. : Queen Victoria, her life and empire by John Campbell, 9th Duke of Argyll, 1901

In 1824, when Franz Liszt toured in Britain as a twelve year old, Rudkin upstaged him on a Manchester stage, after which she became a sought-after public and private performer for the next three years. In 1827, 200,000 people heard her perform in Edinburgh, Scotland, and she also played in Brighton, Dublin, London, Margate, Southampton, and Worthing. By the time that Rudkin was 6 years old she had earned over £30,000.

Rudkin was invited to play for Princess Victoria of Saxe-Coburg-Saalfeld, the Duchess of Kent, and her five-year-old daughter the future Queen Victoria in December 1824, and the children played together at Kensington Palace. She also performed for other members of the royal family, such as Princess Augusta Sophia, Princess Sophia and Princess Amelia (King George III and Charlotte of Mecklenburg-Strelitz's daughters); Prince Adolphus, Duke of Cambridge and his wife Princess Augusta of Hesse-Kassel; and Prince William Frederick, Duke of Gloucester and Edinburgh and his wife Princess Mary, Duchess of Gloucester and Edinburgh.

After her childhood fame, in 1841 she married her first cousin and the Rector of Queenstown, Ireland, George Sacksville Cotter Hingston, living as a minor member of the landed gentry. They had ten children. After her first husband's death, she married George Rainy, as his third wife, in 1860.

She died in London in 1888.
