= List of listed buildings in Fowlis Wester, Perth and Kinross =

This is a list of listed buildings in the parish of Fowlis Wester in Perth and Kinross, Scotland.

== List ==
| Name | Location | Date Listed | Grid Ref. (Note: Sometimes known as OSGB36, the grid reference (where provided) is based on the British national grid reference system used by the Ordnance Survey. • "Guide to National Grid". Ordnance Survey. • "Get-a-map". Ordnance Survey.) | Geo-coordinates | Notes | LB Number (Note: Historic Environment Scotland assign a unique alphanumeric identifier to each designated site in Scotland, for listed buildings this always begins with "LB", for example "LB12345".) | Image |
|---|---|---|---|---|---|---|---|
| Conyachan Farm (Conichan On Map) | | | | 56°28′06″N 3°53′00″W | Category C(S) | 12215 | Upload Photo |
| Tomenbowie, Burial Ground Near Conyachan Farm | | | | 56°28′12″N 3°53′25″W | Category C(S) | 12216 | Upload Photo |
| Abercairny House Gardens, 2 Marble Busts At W. Gate On Main E.-W. Avenue | | | | 56°22′56″N 3°45′49″W | Category B | 12204 | Upload Photo |
| Glenalmond House | | | | 56°26′26″N 3°44′04″W | Category B | 12217 | Upload Photo |
| Balgowan School, Dalbarber | | | | 56°24′22″N 3°37′47″W | Category C(S) | 12222 | Upload Photo |
| Churchyard Walls, Gate And Gravestones | | | | 56°23′49″N 3°44′17″W | Category B | 12247 | Upload Photo |
| Village Cottages, Fowlis, J. Mccoll And One Vacant | | | | 56°23′47″N 3°44′22″W | Category C(S) | 12252 | Upload Photo |
| The Grange Fowlis Wester | | | | 56°23′36″N 3°44′28″W | Category B | 12253 | Upload Photo |
| Connachan Lodge | | | | 56°25′39″N 3°47′31″W | Category A | 12213 | Upload Photo |
| Tulchan Gardens | | | | 56°26′07″N 3°42′19″W | Category B | 12219 | Upload Photo |
| Parish Church (St. Beanus) | | | | 56°23′48″N 3°44′18″W | Category B | 12246 | Upload another image |
| Cultoquhey House Sundial | | | | 56°23′20″N 3°47′45″W | Category B | 12209 | Upload Photo |
| Auchilhanzie | | | | 56°23′48″N 3°47′06″W | Category B | 12212 | Upload Photo |
| Newton Bridge On A822 Over River Almond | | | | 56°27′45″N 3°48′25″W | Category B | 12214 | Upload Photo |
| Carsehead Farmhouse | | | | 56°23′16″N 3°41′52″W | Category B | 12223 | Upload Photo |
| Fowlis Wester, K6 Telephone Kiosk At Post Office | | | | 56°23′47″N 3°44′18″W | Category B | 12225 | Upload Photo |
| Village Hall, Fowlis Old Section Only | | | | 56°23′47″N 3°44′20″W | Category C(S) | 12251 | Upload Photo |
| Abercairny, Crieff Lodge | | | | 56°23′17″N 3°46′29″W | Category B | 12254 | Upload Photo |
| Abercairny, Garden Lodge | | | | 56°23′02″N 3°46′46″W | Category B | 12255 | Upload Photo |
| Abercairny Sundial | | | | 56°22′52″N 3°45′54″W | Category A | 12257 | Upload Photo |
| Glen Cottage, Croftmore And Robertson, Glen Road, Gilmerton | | | | 56°23′30″N 3°48′25″W | Category C(S) | 12211 | Upload Photo |
| West Tulchan | | | | 56°26′05″N 3°42′07″W | Category C(S) | 12220 | Upload Photo |
| Keillour Castle | | | | 56°24′42″N 3°39′40″W | Category C(S) | 12221 | Upload Photo |
| Schoolhouse, Fowlis Village | | | | 56°23′46″N 3°44′19″W | Category C(S) | 12249 | Upload Photo |
| Post Office And Shop Fowlis Village | | | | 56°23′47″N 3°44′18″W | Category C(S) | 12250 | Upload Photo |
| Abercairny House Gardens, Statue Avenue | | | | 56°22′56″N 3°45′49″W | Category B | 12258 | Upload Photo |
| Bridge Of Buchanty | | | | 56°26′07″N 3°43′51″W | Category B | 12218 | Upload Photo |
| Bridge On A822 Over Newton Burn | | | | 56°27′56″N 3°48′16″W | Category C(S) | 13809 | Upload Photo |
| Abercairny Stable Block | | | | 56°22′58″N 3°45′37″W | Category B | 12206 | Upload another image |
| Cultoquhey House (Hotel) | | | | 56°23′21″N 3°47′43″W | Category B | 12208 | Upload Photo |
| Abercairny, Avenue Of Busts | | | | 56°22′56″N 3°45′49″W | Category B | 12205 | Upload another image |
| Store, Glen Road, Gilmerton, The Property Of Hugh Mccall Smith. (Former Free Church) | | | | 56°23′31″N 3°48′24″W | Category B | 12210 | Upload Photo |
| Fowlis Wester Parish Church, Cross Of Fowlis | | | | 56°23′48″N 3°44′17″W | Category B | 12248 | Upload Photo |
| Abercairny Doocot | | | | 56°23′01″N 3°46′34″W | Category B | 12256 | Upload Photo |

== Key ==
The scheme for classifying buildings in Scotland is:

- Category A: "buildings of national or international importance, either architectural or historic; or fine, little-altered examples of some particular period, style or building type."
- Category B: "buildings of regional or more than local importance; or major examples of some particular period, style or building type, which may have been altered."
- Category C: "buildings of local importance; lesser examples of any period, style, or building type, as originally constructed or moderately altered; and simple traditional buildings which group well with other listed buildings."

In March 2016 there were 47,288 listed buildings in Scotland. Of these, 8% were Category A, and 50% were Category B, with the remaining 42% being Category C.
