= Archibald Stirling (British Army officer) =

British army officer and MP

Brigadier-General Archibald Stirling DL
- Born: 1867
- Died: 18 February 1931 (aged 63-64)
- Relatives: Sir William Stirling-Maxwell, 9th Baronet (father); Bill Stirling (son); Sir David Stirling (son)
- Military career
- Allegiance: United Kingdom
- Branch: British Army
- Service years: 1889–1922
- Rank: Brigadier-General
- Unit: Scots Guards
- Commands: 2nd Dismounted Brigade; Highland Mounted Brigade; 2nd Lovat Scouts
- Conflicts: Mahdist War; Second Boer War; First World War
- Awards: Mentioned in Despatches (2)

Brigadier-General Archibald Stirling of Keir and Cawdor, DL (1867 – 18 February 1931) was a Scottish officer of the British Army who also served as a Member of Parliament.

== Early life and family ==
Stirling was born at Keir near Dunblane, the second son of Sir William Stirling-Maxwell, 9th Baronet of Keir and Pollok and his wife Lady Anna Maria, second daughter of the 10th Earl of Leven and Melville. Sir John Stirling-Maxwell, 10th Baronet was his elder brother and Stirling was heir-presumptive to the baronetcy.

Stirling was married in 1910 to the Hon. Margaret "Peggy" Fraser, fourth daughter of the 13th Lord Lovat. His fiancée's family were devout Roman Catholics, and so he had to convert from his family's nominal protestantism to Catholicism in order to win her hand in marriage. Together, they had four sons and two daughters. He was a member of the Guards' Club, the Carlton Club and the Turf Club.

Stirling's sons include Lieutenant-Colonel Bill Stirling of Keir and Lieutenant-Colonel Sir Archibald David Stirling. The current Laird of the Keir estate is Bill's son Archie Stirling, a millionaire businessman and former Scots Guards officer.

== Military career ==
Educated at Eton and Trinity College, Cambridge, Stirling joined the Scots Guards in 1889. He was promoted from second lieutenant to lieutenant on 4 May 1892, and to captain on 24 June 1899. He served with the Egyptian Army from 1899 to 1900, and was awarded the Queen's Sudan Medal with clasp for Soudan. Following the outbreak of the Second Boer War, he joined the 2nd Battalion of his regiment and left Southampton for South Africa on the SS Britannic in March 1900. The battalion was attached to the 16th Infantry Brigade, and Stirling served throughout the war from 1900 to 1902. For his service he was awarded the Queen's South Africa Medal with three clasps and the King's South Africa Medal with two clasps. He retired from the service on 17 June 1903, receiving a gratuity, and became a captain in the Reserve of Officers. On 23 January 1904 he joined the Imperial Yeomanry as a major in Lovat's Scouts, transferring to the Territorial Force on 1 April 1908. He was promoted to lieutenant colonel on 18 August 1909, and was commanding officer of the 2nd Lovat Scouts. On 11 October 1915 Stirling was appointed a brigade commander, with the temporary rank of brigadier general: he commanded the Highland Mounted Brigade at Gallipoli in 1915 and the 2nd Dismounted Brigade in Egypt in 1916. He was transferred to the Territorial Force Reserve as a lieutenant colonel on 19 September 1916.

For his service during the war, Stirling was mentioned in despatches twice, and was awarded the 1914–15 Star, the British War Medal and the Victory Medal; he was given the honorary rank of brigadier general in the army, dated from 19 September 1916.

Stirling relinquished his commission as lieutenant colonel in the Territorial Army Reserve on 30 September 1921, but was appointed colonel in the Regular Army Reserve of Officers on 1 March 1922. Having reached the age limit, he relinquished his commission in the Army Reserve as well on 9 December 1922, retaining his rank and the right to wear the uniform.

== Politics and post-war ==
On 21 February 1917, Stirling was elected unopposed as Unionist Member of Parliament for West Perthshire. He sat until the general election of 1918, when he unsuccessfully contested Kinross and Western Perthshire. This was a shock defeat, having received the endorsement of the coalition government, and was blamed in the local press on his "perversion" (i.e. Roman Catholicism).

In 1920, Stirling became a member of the War Office Committee of Enquiry into "Shell-shock", which published its final report in 1922.

Parliament of the United Kingdom
Preceded by Marquess of Tullibardine	Member of Parliament for West Perthshire; 1917–1918	Succeeded by James Gardiner (for Kinross and West Perthshire)
