= 1878 Perthshire by-election =

UK Parliamentary by-election

The 1878 Perthshire by-election was fought on 2 February 1878. The by-election was fought due to the death of the incumbent Conservative MP, Sir William Stirling-Maxwell. It was won by the Conservative candidate Henry Home-Drummond-Moray.

1878 Perthshire by-election
Party	Candidate	Votes	%	±%
Conservative	Henry Home-Drummond-Moray	2,439	52.0	−3.4
Liberal	Algernon Greville-Nugent	2,255	48.0	+3.4
Majority		184	4.0	−6.8
Turnout		4,694	83.6	−0.2
Registered electors		5,613		
Conservative hold		Swing	-3.4	
