= George Rainy =

Scottish merchant, slave owner and landowner

George Rainy (6 June 1790 – 9 June 1863) was a Scottish merchant, slave owner and land owner.

In the early 1800s, Rainy became involved in sugar plantations in the Caribbean which were worked by African slaves in Demerara in Guiana. Due to extensive family connections he eventually became a full partner in Sandbach, Tinne & Company, a Scottish-run company which dealt in trade in the same field and was prominent in British Guiana, to the extent that the men who ran it were called the "Rothschilds of Demerara" on account of their wealth and influence.

After the abolition of the Atlantic slave trade in the British Empire in the 1830s, Rainy became involved in the Highland Clearances. Using monies from the payout to former slave-owners following the Slavery Abolition Act 1833, he purchased the islands of Raasay, Rona and Fladda from Clan MacLeod in 1846: he removed from the land twelve townships of ninety-four Gaelic Highlander families to make way for sheep farming, causing mass depopulation and displacement on the islands.

== Biography ==
=== Background ===
George Rainy was born to Rev. George Rainy (1734–1810), a Presbyterian Church of Scotland minister in Creich, Sutherland, Scotland and his wife Ann Robertson. His grandfather had been John Rennie, a farmer in Turriff, Aberdeenshire, Scotland. Among George's siblings were Margaret Rainy (1774–1844), who married to Charles Parker (1771–1828), from a Scottish family in the Colony of Virginia and a major player in Sandbach, Tinne & Company, which ran sugarcane plantations in Demerara, Guiana. In addition to this, there was a brother Gilbert Rainy (1782–1808) who had gone to Berbice, Guiana to engage in the same trade.

Harry Rainy, the noted pathologist and Professor of Forensic Medicine at the University of Glasgow was another brother, making George Rainy the uncle of Robert Rainy a Scottish Presbyterian divine for whom Rainy Hall in New College, Edinburgh is named.

=== Plantations in Guiana ===
George Rainy followed his brother, Gilbert Rainy, into the sugar trade in Guiana. He became associated with the Scottish-dominated, Liverpool-based company Sandbach, Tinne & Company. This company had been founded in 1790 when his uncle George Robertson, who had been trading in Grenada and his future brother-in-law Charles Parker joined with Samuel Sandbach and the Demerara merchant James McInroy (1759–1825) to create what was originally known as McInroy, Sandbach & Company. This business had been described as the "Rothschilds of Demerara" in the 1820s.

It would become one of the most successful trading companies in the Caribbean, dealing with sugar plantations in the Caribbean which were worked by African slaves. These families created strong connections to each other through marriage. By the time that George Rainy joined the company as a partner in Liverpool it had become Sandbach, Tinne & Company.

According to the journal of J.C. Cheveley, who visited in 1821, the estates in Demerara containing the slave-worked sugar plantations, were heavily mortgaged to Sandbach, Tinne & Company. He stated that many estates which were mortgaged out had to rely on the company for shipping out sugar on ships owned by them, through their agents in Guiana and Britain.

According to the Legacies of British Slave-Ownership at the University College London, Rainy was awarded a payment as a slave trader in the aftermath of the Slavery Abolition Act 1833 with the Slave Compensation Act 1837. The British Government took out a £15 million loan (worth £1.54 billion in 2025) with interest from Nathan Mayer Rothschild and Moses Montefiore which was subsequently paid off by the British taxpayers (ending in 2015). Rainy had a large number of primary and secondary claims, thirty in total. Rainy owned 2793 slaves in Guiana and received a £146,295 payment at the time (worth £15.1 million in 2025).

Some Scottish newspapers, including, The Sunday Post have claimed that Rainy received the largest payout of all the slave owners. The largest plantations which Rainy owned in Guiana were Leonora, Zeelandia, La Jalousie & Fellowship, among others.

=== Highland Clearances ===
As the Atlantic slave trade and the triangular trade associated with it was brought to an end, Rainy returned to Britain. In 1846, George Rainy bought the islands of Raasay, Rona and Fladda, a group of islands in the Gàidhealtachd, between the Isle of Skye and the mainland of Scotland. The island had been ruled by Clan Macleod of Raasay for several centuries but had declined in the aftermath of their clan rallying to the standard of Charles Edward Stuart in the Jacobite rising of 1745. The last laird, John Macleod, was deep in debt and chose to emigrate to Tasmania having sold Raasay for 35,000 guineas to Rainy. During this period, with the decline of traditional culture in the Scottish Highlands, many land speculators and landlords moved in to "improve" the estate; the main purpose of this was to clear the native Highland Gaels from the lands, either to urban centres in Great Britain or abroad to North America and Australasia, to make way for sheep farming. This was known as the Highland Clearances. When Rainy came to control Raasay, he set about implementing this process on the island and has been described as "a cruel landlord who epitomised the horror of the Clearances." There had been a steady drip of emigration from the island in the previous two decades, but when Rainy came to control the islands, this went into overdrive.

Donald MacLeod (born 1805), a crofter from Torran, Raasay provided testimony to the Napier Commission on 22 May 1883 in regards to abuses under Rainy's tenure at Raasay. He stated that when Rainy came to control the island he enacted a rule that nobody should marry on the island, so that the local natives could not reproduce their population. This has been described as "a measure of control reminiscent of the slave plantations". MacLeod described an incident where a man by the name of John MacLeod decided to marry, contrary to Rainy's ruling and to make an example of him, he was removed from his father's house, then fled to stay in a sheep cot, but that was set on fire as well and none of his friends or anybody else would dare to give him shelter for the night. Rainy cleared twelve townships of their inhabitants in total to set up sheep farming, with ninety-four Highland Scots families forced from the island, causing mass depopulation and displacement.

Scottish poet and Raasay-native Sorley MacLean authored the Scottish Gaelic poem Hallaig about the Rainy years on Raasay.

== Personal life ==
George Rainy was married three times; firstly to Margaret Jessie Louisa Darroch, the daughter of Lieutenant General Duncan Darroch, 2nd Baron of Gourock from the Glengarry Fencibles. She died without issue in 1840. After this, Rainy took Elizabeth Haygarth as his second wife, she was the daughter of Rev. George Haygarth, she died in 1856. The couple did have a child together, Rainy's one and only son, George Haygarth Rainy (1845–1872), who died in his 20s without issue. Thirdly, Rainy married Isabella Rudkin, the widow of the Rev. George Hingston. No issue came from this marriage. After the death of George Haygarth Rainy the trustees of his estate disposed the Rainy controlled lands in the Inner Hebrides in favour of George Grant MacKay of Rosehall and Oban. George Rainy had two daughters who were born in Demerara. They returned with him to England in 1837 and later the sisters emigrated to Australia.
