= 1917 West Perthshire by-election =

UK Parliamentary by-election

The 1917 West Perthshire by-election was held on 21 February 1917. The by-election was held due to the incumbent Conservative MP, Lord Tullibardine succeeding to the peerage as Duke of Atholl. It was won by the Conservative candidate Archibald Stirling who was unopposed due to a War-time electoral pact.
