= Robert Graham (Whig politician) =

British politician (1785–1859)

Robert Graham (1785–1859), of Redgorton, was a Scottish advocate and landowner who briefly sat as a Whig Lord of the Treasury.

== Life ==
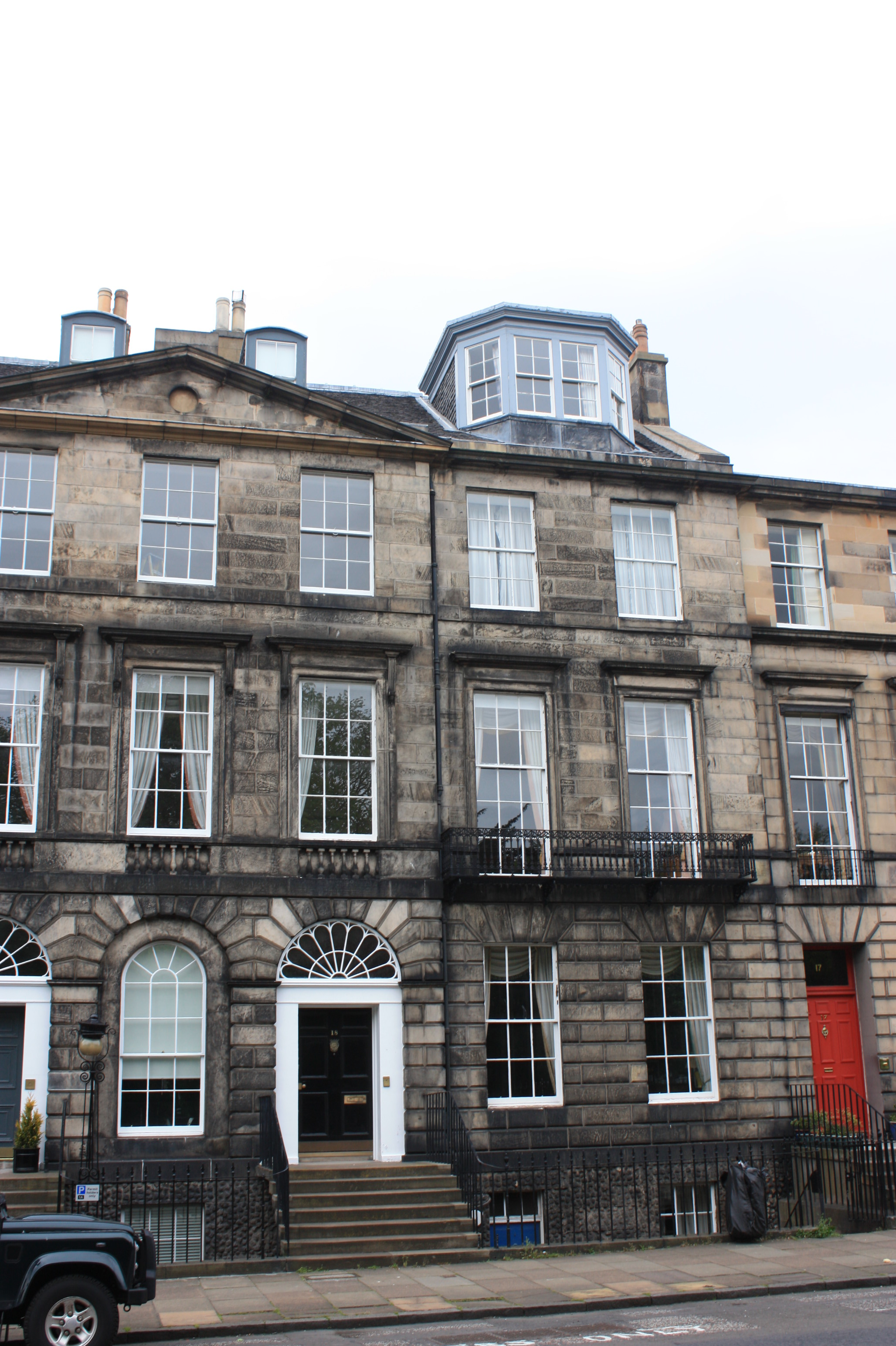
Robert Graham's house at 18 Heriot Row, Edinburgh

Graham was the son of John Graham of Eskbank and his wife Mary Scott.

In the 1830s Robert Graham, advocate is listed as living at 18 Heriot Row, one of the most prestigious addresses in the Edinburgh New Town.

In April 1834, he was appointed a Lord of the Treasury in Lord Melbourne's administration, although not a Member of Parliament; no sitting member was willing to risk the by-election entailed by the appointment. In the following month, he contested Perthshire at a by-election following the Earl of Ormelie's succession as Marquess of Breadalbane, but was defeated by Sir George Murray. Graham lost his place at the Treasury board when the Melbourne government fell in November and did not return to political office.

In 1843, he inherited the estate of Balgowan from his second cousin, Lord Lynedoch; he sold it in 1844. When he died in 1859, his nephew, James Maxtone, inherited Redgorton and adopted the additional name and arms of Graham to become James Maxtone-Graham.
