= John Stewart-Murray, 8th Duke of Atholl =

British soldier and Unionist politician

Brigadier-General His Grace The Duke of Atholl KT GCVO CB DSO PC
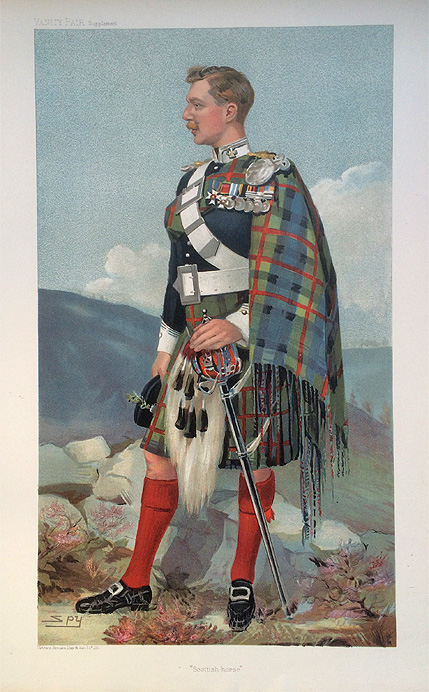
- Vanity Fair portrait by Spy (Leslie Ward), 23 March 1905
- Born: 15 December 1871; Blair Castle, Perthshire
- Died: 16 March 1942 (aged 70)
- Spouse: Katharine Ramsay
- Military career
- Allegiance: United Kingdom
- Branch: British Army
- Rank: Brigadier-General
- Nickname: Bardie (short for Tullibardine)
- Units: Royal Horse Guards; Scottish Horse
- Commands: The Scottish Horse Brigade
- Conflicts: Siege of Khartoum; Battle of Atbara; Second Boer War; First World War
- Awards: Knight of the Order of the Thistle; Knight Grand Cross of the Royal Victorian Order; Companion of the Order of the Bath; Distinguished Service Order
- Other work: Unionist Member of Parliament; Lord Chamberlain

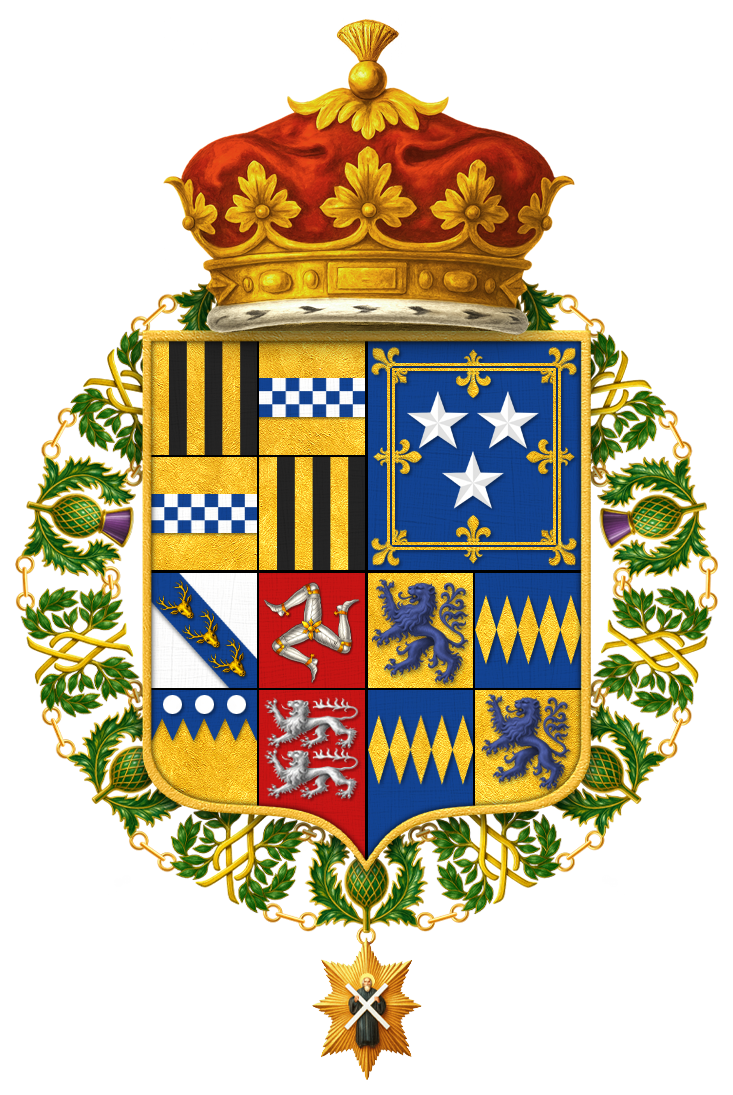
Shield of Arms of John George Stewart-Murray, 8th Duke of Atholl, KT, GCVO, CB, DSO, PC, ADC

John George Stewart-Murray, 8th Duke of Atholl, KT, GCVO, CB, DSO, PC (15 December 1871 – 16 March 1942), styled Marquess of Tullibardine until 1917, was a British soldier and Unionist politician.

== Early life ==
Styled Marquess of Tullibardine from birth, he was born at Blair Castle, Perthshire, the second but eldest surviving son of John Stewart-Murray, 7th Duke of Atholl, by Louisa, daughter of Sir Thomas Moncreiffe of that Ilk, 7th Baronet. and was educated at Eton College. He learned to speak Gaelic before English. In "Working Partnership" his wife, The Duchess of Atholl, says that Tullibardine and all his siblings were brought up to speak Gaelic and were "extremely proficient" in it. He was President of An Comunn Gàidhealach, the national Gaelic Society, from 1898 until 1904.

== Military career ==
=== Service in the Royal Horse Guards ===
He was commissioned into the Royal Horse Guards with the rank of second lieutenant on 28 December 1892, and was promoted to lieutenant on 30 December 1893. He served in Kitchener's expedition to the Sudan, fighting at the Siege of Khartoum and the Battle of Atbara. He was awarded the Distinguished Service Order (DSO) on 15 November 1898, and rose to the rank of captain a year later, on 20 November 1899.

=== Second Boer War ===
In 1900 he served as an aide-de-camp to Brigadier-General J. F. Burn-Murdoch, in command of a brigade of the Cavalry division stationed in Natal. In November 1900 he was given the rank of brevet major in the Royal Horse Guards, and asked by Lord Kitchener, whom he had served under on the Omdurman Campaign, to raise a regiment of Scotsmen in South Africa, called The Scottish Horse. The regiment was raised quickly and soon saw active service in the Western Transvaal. A second regiment of Scottish Horse was raised from troops recruited by The 7th Duke of Atholl and a permanent headquarters was set up to supply both of these regiments, with Atholl in command but with subordinate commanding officers in the field in charge of each of the Regiments. This success continued until the Scottish Horse was a whole brigade by the end of the Second Boer War. In August 1901 Lord Tullibardine received the local rank of lieutenant colonel in South Africa while commanding the Scottish Horse. He was mentioned in despatches by Lord Kitchener dated 23 June 1902. Following the end of the war in June 1902, Lord Tullibardine and most of the men of the Scottish Horse left Cape Town on the SS Goth in early August, and arrived at Southampton later the same month.

After his return to the United Kingdom, he was on 28 September 1902 received at Balmoral Castle by King Edward VII, who presented him with the Insignia of a Member (4th class) of the Royal Victorian Order (MVO) for his services in South Africa. The following year he was promoted to the substantive rank of lieutenant colonel in the Army.

=== First World War ===
In the Great War Atholl commanded a Brigade of a Yeomanry Regiment and took them to fight dismounted (without horses) in the Dardanelles campaign against the Turks. He gained the rank of temporary brigadier general in 1918.

=== Further service ===
During the Second World War, despite being seventy years old, Atholl joined the Home Guard and reportedly took turns as sentry officer on duty in Whitehall. He remained closely involved with the Scottish Horse, remaining in the post of Colonel Commandant until 1919 and Honorary Colonel from 1920 until his death in 1942. He was key in establishing a Scottish National War Memorial in Edinburgh Castle after the First World War and his papers relating to this are retained by the National Library of Scotland.

== Political career ==
As Marquess of Tullibardine, Atholl was elected as Unionist Member of Parliament for West Perthshire at the January 1910 general election and served in the Commons until 1917, when he succeeded his father and took his seat in the House of Lords as the 8th Duke of Atholl. In 1918 he was made a Knight of the Order of the Thistle, and then served as Lord High Commissioner to the General Assembly of the Church of Scotland until 1920. In November 1921 he was sworn of the Privy Council and appointed Lord Chamberlain of the Household by David Lloyd George, a post he held until the coalition government fell in October of the following year.

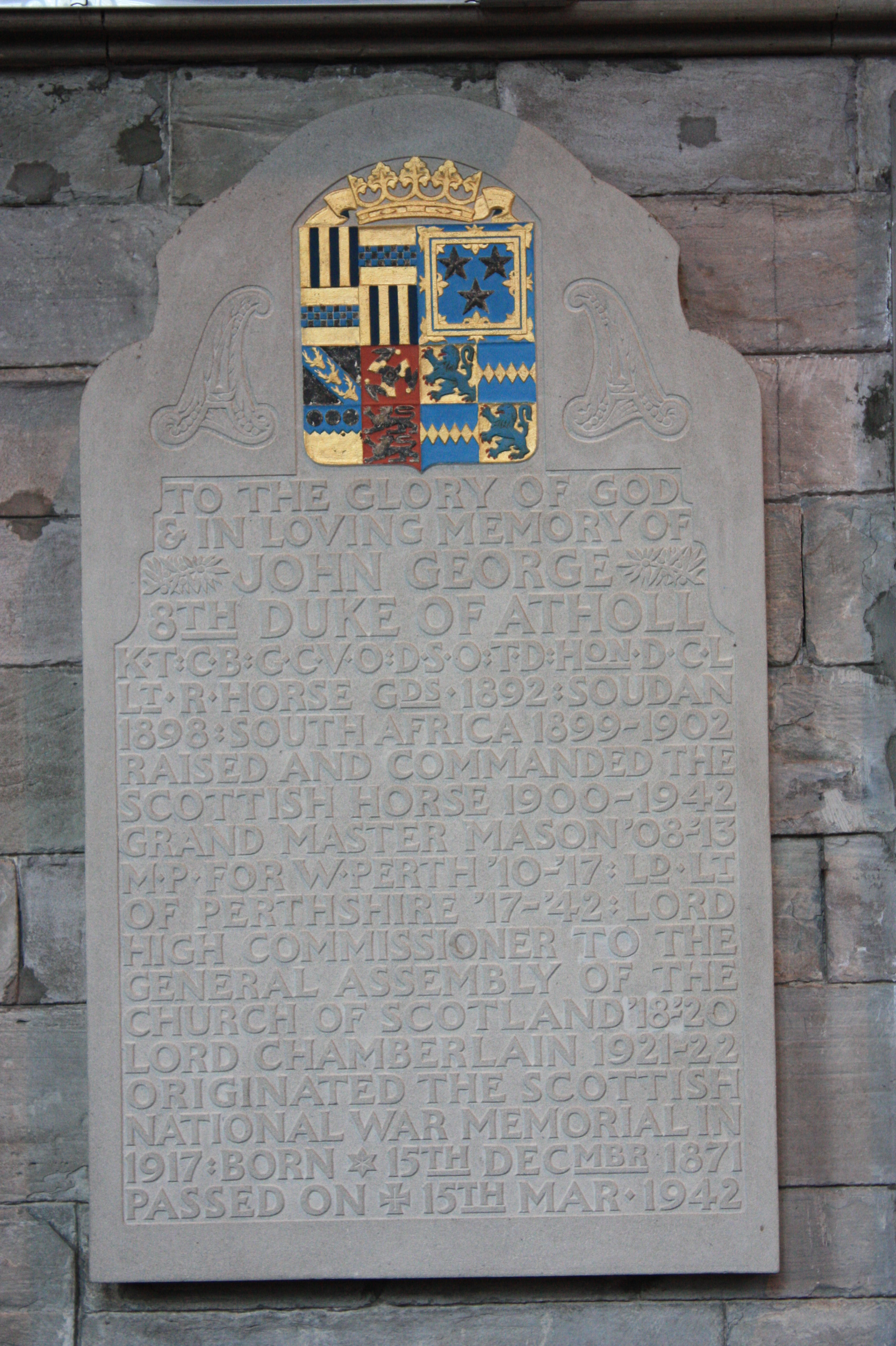
Memorial to John George, 8th Duke of Atholl, Dunkeld Cathedral

Apart from his military and political careers Atholl served as Grand Master of Scottish Freemasons between 1908 and 1913 and as an Aide-de-camp to King George V between 1920 and 1931. He was granted the Freedom of the City of Edinburgh. According to his wife's autobiography Working Partnership (1958), Atholl was considered a possible contender for the crown of Albania after a chance meeting with a delegation in Florence who were impressed with his personality.

== Lottery ==
In 1932 Atholl came to national attention when he launched a lottery in an attempt to stop money going overseas to the Irish Free State Hospitals Sweepstakes. The money this scheme raised was given to British charities, mainly hospitals, but in 1933 he was prosecuted by the Director of Public Prosecutions, Sir Edward Hale Tindal Atkinson, for promoting an unlawful lottery. Despite this, Atholl's lottery activities were admired and seen by many British people as being patriotic.

== Family life ==
While still Marquess of Tullibardine, Atholl married Katharine Ramsay, daughter of Sir James Ramsay, 10th Baronet, at St Margaret's Church, Westminster, on 20 July 1899. His wife went on to have a long political career in her own right in local government, in the House of Commons, and as a government minister. They had no children. Atholl died on 16 March 1942, aged 70, and was succeeded by his youngest brother, James Stewart-Murray. His widow, Katharine, Duchess of Atholl, died in October 1960, aged 85.

Parliament of the United Kingdom
Preceded by David Erskine	Member of Parliament for Perthshire West; January 1910 – 1917	Succeeded by Archibald Stirling
Court offices
Preceded by The Viscount Sandhurst	Lord Chamberlain; 1921–1922	Succeeded by The Earl of Cromer
Honorary titles
Preceded by The Duke of Atholl	Lord Lieutenant of Perthshire; 1917–1942	Succeeded by Lord Kinnaird
Military offices
Preceded by Regiment raised by 8th Duke of Atholl	Colonel Commandant/ Honorary Colonel of the Scottish Horse; 1901–1919; 1920–1942	Succeeded by The Duchess of Atholl DBE DL
Masonic offices
Preceded by Thomas Gibson-Carmichael	Grand Master of the Grand Lodge of Scotland; 1909–1913	Succeeded by Robert King Stewart
Peerage of Scotland
Preceded by John Stewart-Murray	Duke of Atholl; 1917–1942	Succeeded by James Stewart-Murray
