= Robert Rainy =

Scottish minister

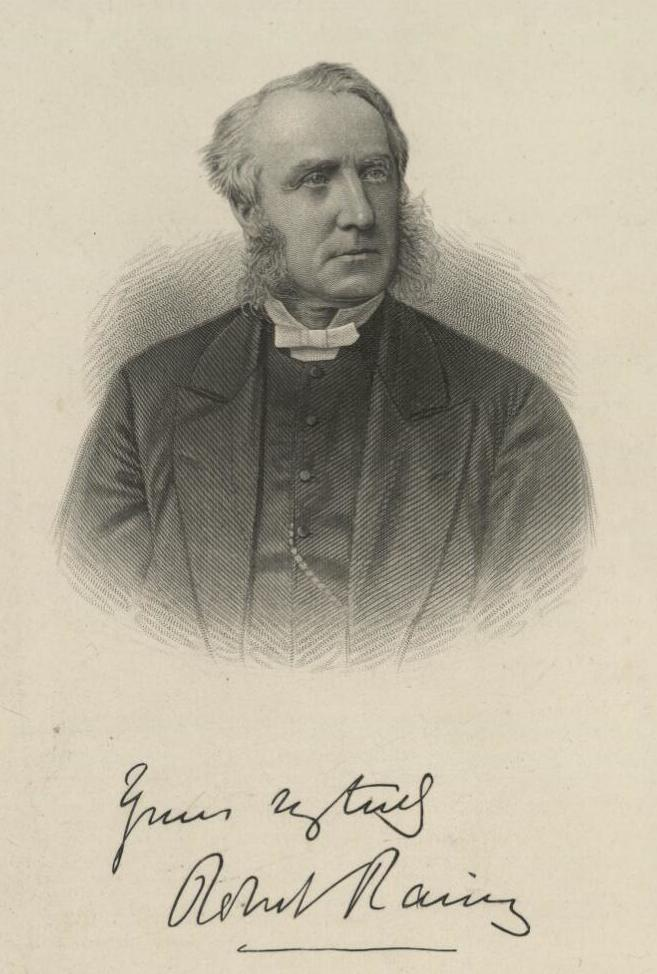
- Born: 1 January 1826; Glasgow, Scotland
- Died: 22 December 1906 (aged 80); Melbourne, Australia
- Spouse: Susan Rolland (1835–1905)
- Children: Adam Rainy; Henry Craigie Rainy
- Parent(s): Harry Rainy (1792–1876); Barbara Gordon (1793–1854)
- Church: Presbyterian
- Ordained: Huntly

Robert Rainy (1 January 1826 – 22 December 1906), was a Scottish Presbyterian divine. Rainy Hall in New College, Edinburgh (the Divinity faculty at Edinburgh University) is named after him.

== Life ==
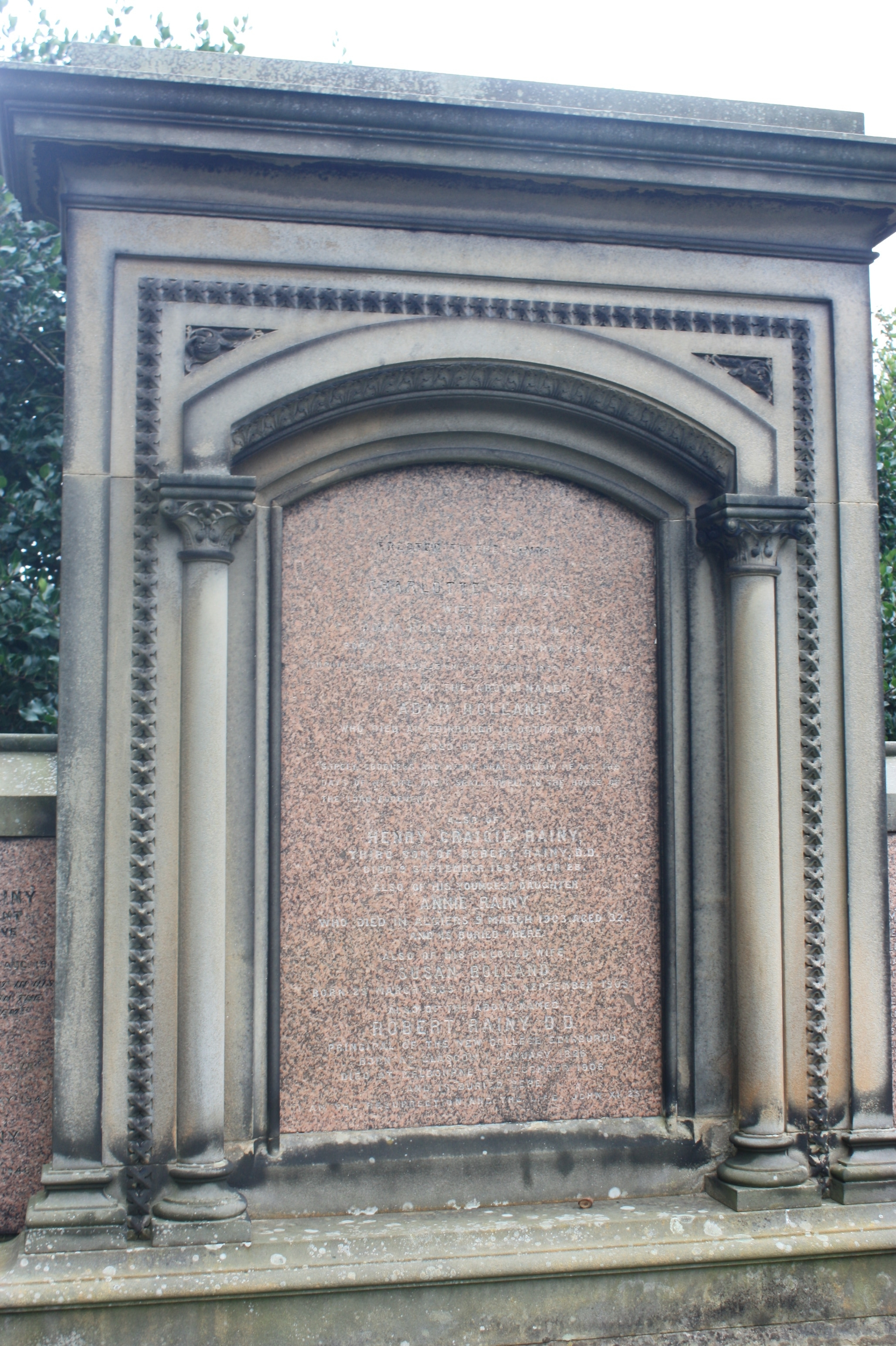
The huge monument at Robert Rainy's grave, Dean Cemetery

He was born on New Year's Day 1826 at 28 Montrose Street in Glasgow, Scotland, the son of Dr. Harry Rainy LLD (1792–1876) a surgeon who later served as professor of forensic medicine in the University of Glasgow, and his wife Barbara Gordon (1793–1854). The family lived at 28 Montrose Street. One of his uncles was George Rainy, the noted slave plantation owner and personality involved in the Highland Clearances.

Robert initially studied medicine at Glasgow University to follow his father's career. However, his interests turned to the church, which had been the path of his grandfather, Rev George Rainy (1734–1810) of Sutherland, in northern Scotland. He was caught by the evangelical fervour of the Disruption of 1843, and moved to Edinburgh to train as Free Church minister at New College.

He was ordained by the Free Church at Huntly in Aberdeenshire in 1851 and then in 1854 moved to the Free High Church in Edinburgh (occupying the north-east section of New College). In 1862 he was elected professor of church history in the same college. In 1874 he was made principal of the college in succession to Robert Candlish, and was subsequently known as Principal Rainy. At this time he lived at 8 Rosebery Crescent in Edinburgh's West End.

He had come to the front as a champion of the Liberal Party in the Union controversy within the Free Church, and in combating Dean Stanley's Broad Church views in the interests of Scotch evangelicism.

From 1875 he became one of the leading figures of the Free Church. He guided it through the controversies as to Robertson Smith's heresies, as to the use of hymns and instrumental music (a large part of the church preferring unaccompanied singing), and also to the Declaratory Act. In this he was one of the figures who brought to a successful conclusion the union of the Free Church of Scotland and United Presbyterian Churches, and threw the weight of the newly united church on the side of freedom of Biblical criticism.

He was Moderator of the General Assembly of the Free Church of Scotland in 1887 in succession to Rev Alexander Neill Somerville and was succeeded in turn by Rev John Laird in 1888. Following the Union of 1900 he left the Free Church of Scotland to join as leader of the United Free Church of Scotland serving as its first Moderator.

Though not a great scholar he was eminent as an ecclesiastical statesman, and his influence was far-reaching. After the strain of the fight with the so-called Wee Frees in 1904-5 his health broke down.

In his final years he was living at 8 Rosebery Crescent in Edinburgh's West End. However, he went on a trip to Australia to recover his health and died in Melbourne on 22 December 1906.

His body was returned to Scotland and he is buried against the southern wall of Dean Cemetery in Edinburgh. His wife, Susan Rolland (1835–1905) and most of his children (including Adam Rainy MP and Rev Henry Craigie Rainy) lie with him. His monument is nearly identical to that of the brewer John McEwan, slightly to the east of Rainy.

== Publications ==
- Delivery and Development of Christian Doctrine, Edinburgh: T. & T. Clark, 1874 (Cunningham Lectures)
- The Bible and Criticism
- Three Lectures on the Church of Scotland
- Expository Commentary on Philippians
- Life of Principal Cunningham

== Family ==
In 1857 he married Susan Rolland, daughter of Adam Rolland of Gask.

Their children included the politician Adam Rolland Rainy and the Indian civilian Sir George Rainy.

His granddaughter, Barbara Parker, inspired her youngest child, Andrew Parker, to follow in his footsteps. Andrew studied Divinity at New College and went on to become a published biblical scholar.

== Legacy ==
The main secular assembly space within New College is now called Rainy Hall. It was used as a dining hall for the University of Edinburgh's student halls of residence at Mylne's Court and Patrick Geddes Hall until they became self-catering. However, it is still used as a dining hall by New College students and by Commissioners attending the annual General Assembly of the Church of Scotland. Rainy Hall is also available to hire through The University of Edinburgh.
