= Donald Currie =

Scottish shipowner, politician and philanthropist (1825-1909)

Sir Donald Currie GCMG
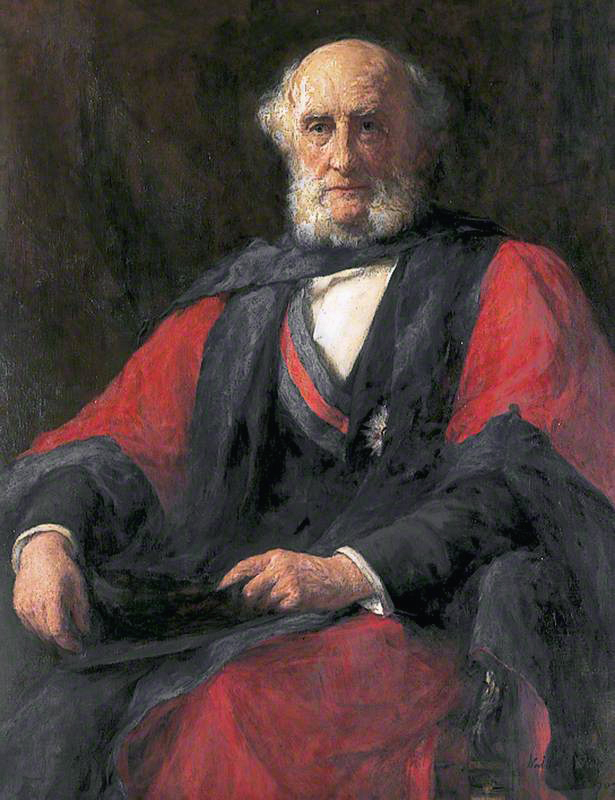
- Donald Currie (Walter William Ouless, 1907)
- Born: 17 September 1825; Greenock, Scotland, United Kingdom
- Died: 13 April 1909 (aged 83); London, England, United Kingdom
- Citizenship: British
- Occupations: Shipowner, politician, philanthropist
- Known for: Union-Castle Line

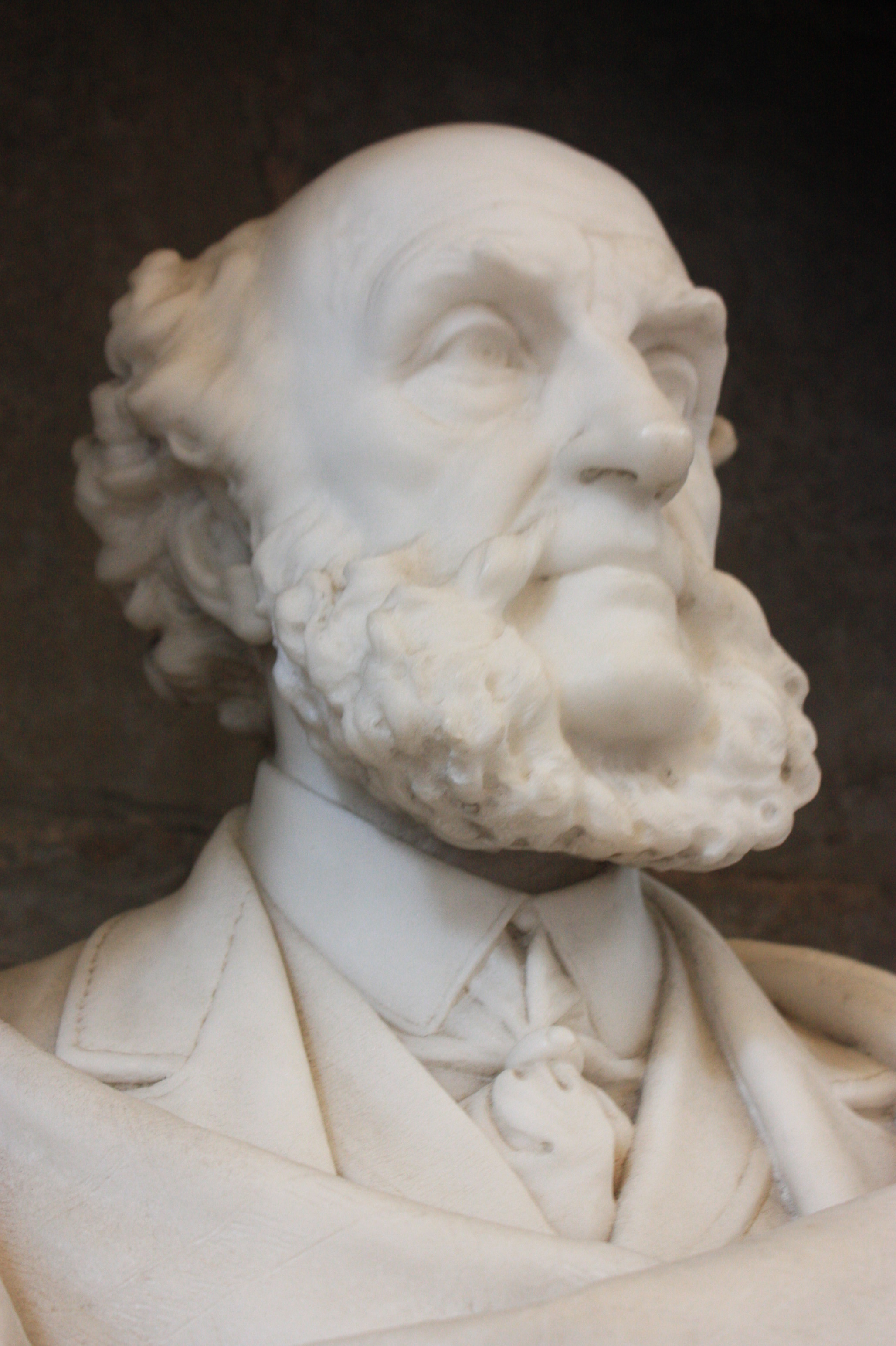
Bust of Donald Currie, Dunkeld Cathedral

Sir Donald Currie GCMG (17 September 1825 – 13 April 1909) was a Scottish shipowner, politician and philanthropist.

== Early life and career ==
He was born at Greenock, Renfrewshire, on 17 September 1825, the third son of ten children of James Currie (1797–1851) and Elizabeth (1798–1839), daughter of Donald Martin, all of Greenock. His parents moved to Belfast in 1826, and Currie was sent at seven to the Belfast Academy, and subsequently to the Royal Belfast Academical Institution; at both schools he distinguished himself. As a boy he interested himself in the sea and shipping, and at fourteen entered the shipping office of a relative in Greenock. After four years there, he joined in 1844 the Cunard Steamship Company, Liverpool, owners of the only regular line of steamers sailing between Europe and America, which numbered no more than three the Caledonia, the Arcadia, and the Britannia, all of small tonnage. Currie became head of the company's cargo department. In 1849, in order to take advantage of the abolition of the navigation laws, the company sent him to establish branch houses at Le Havre and Paris, and in a short time they had a steamer running between Havre and America via Liverpool. He also established branch offices at Bremen and Antwerp, returning to Liverpool in 1854.

In 1862, determining to start for himself, he established the 'Castle' shipping company, which consisted at first of sailing ships plying between Liverpool and Calcutta, owned by a circle of personal friends. Currie first introduced the plan of despatching sailing ships on fixed dates. In 1865, he made London the port of departure of his vessels and took up his residence there.

== Development of the Union-Castle line ==
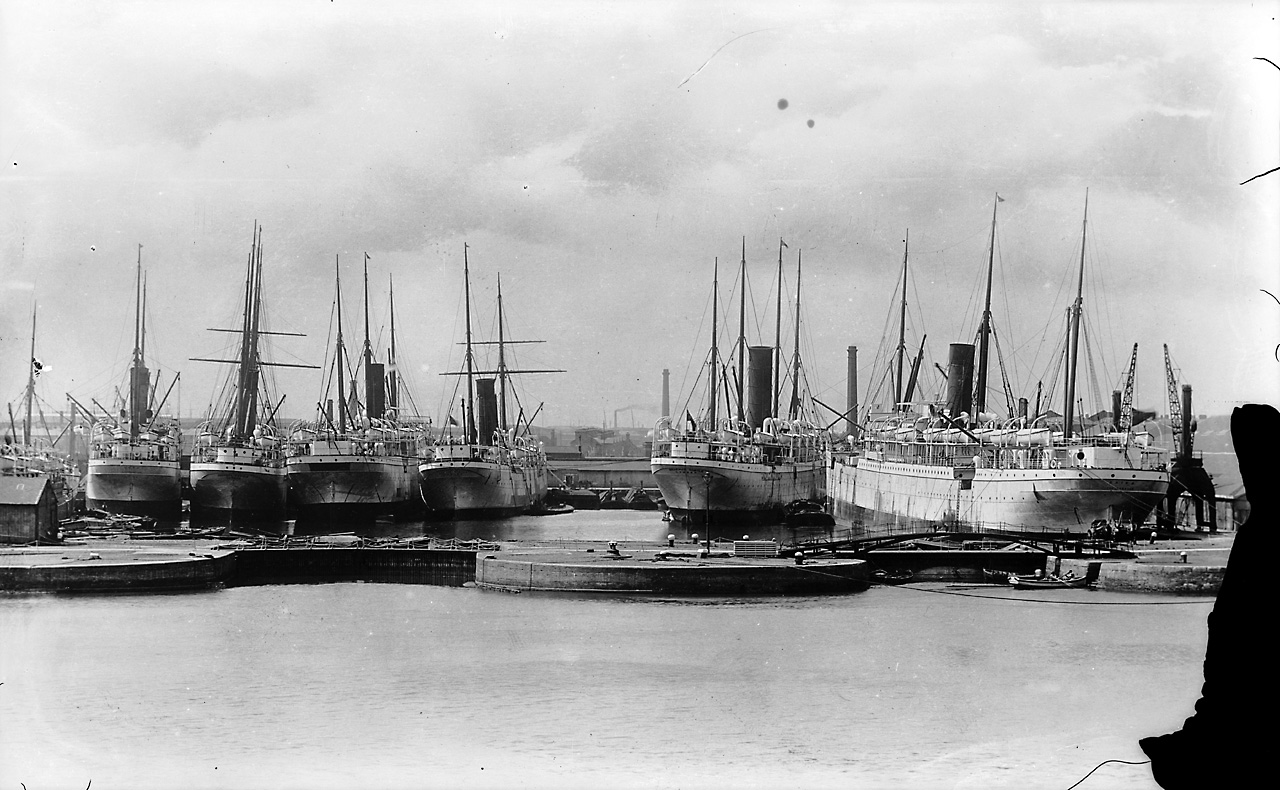
Union-Castle liners in East India Docks, London in 1902

The line grew steadily in strength and importance, and he resolved on a line of steamers from the United Kingdom to Cape Town, the first of which, the Iceland, a vessel of 946 tons, started on her outward trip on 23 January 1872. At the time the Union Steamship Company, founded in 1853, carried on the principal trade between the United Kingdom and South Africa and had the contract for the mail service.

In 1876, the Cape parliament resolved to divide this service equally between the old company and the new. Ultimately in 1900, the two were amalgamated under the name of the Union-Castle Mail Steamship Company, Limited, the joint concern being managed by Messrs. Donald Currie & Co. Before Sir Donald's death the fleet of the united company consisted of forty-seven steamers, with a gross tonnage of 295,411 tons. The enormous improvement of communication between the United Kingdom and South Africa was largely due to Sir Donald and his ships.

Currie soon became recognised as one of the highest authorities on shipping. In 1875, he was elected chairman of a committee of ship-owners to consider proposed changes in laws affecting the mercantile marine, and he was responsible for important amendments of the Merchant Shipping Act of 1876.

Although the Cape Prime Minister John Molteno was a personal friend of Donald Currie, he refused to authorise Currie to run a monopoly – desiring instead to preserve a state of competition between the principal shipping companies. Molteno therefore ordered the South African mail service to be shared equally, between Currie's Castle Company and its older rival, the Union Line. After lengthy negotiations, Currie agreed to alternating services, speed premiums and other clauses to promote competition. The new mail contract was signed on 5 October 1876 and Currie created the Castle Mail Packets Company, with the offices located at the Castle Shipping Line headquarters.

Initially forbidden by the contract from amalgamating, keen competition ensued between the companies. This competition led to their shipping services running at unprecedented speed and efficiency. However the contract eventually expired and several decades later, in 1900, Castle Shipping Line and Union Line would merge and become the Union-Castle Line.

== Political service in South Africa and Britain ==
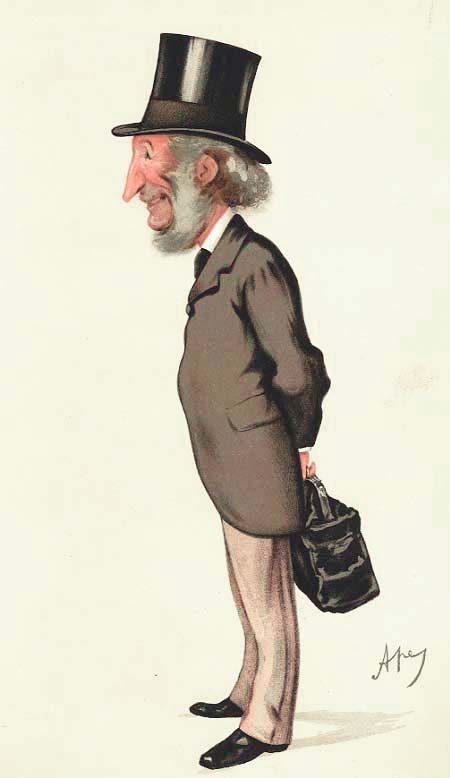
"the Knight of the Cruise of Mr Gladstone" Currie as caricatured by Ape (Carlo Pellegrini) in Vanity Fair, June 1884

His knowledge of South African affairs often proved of advantage to the British government. In 1875 Lord Carnarvon, the colonial secretary, entrusted him with the conduct of negotiations with President Brand of the Orange Free State and President Burgers of the Transvaal Republic regarding the occupation of the Kimberley diamond fields. Currie defined the boundaries, and arranged the terms of agreement. Currie supplied the home government with the first news of the disaster of Isandhlwana during the Zulu war in January 1879. There was at that time no telegraphic connection between the United Kingdom and South Africa; the despatch announcing the calamity was sent from Cape Town by a Castle liner to St. Vincent, and thence telegraphed to Currie in London. Within forty-eight hours, one of the Castle liners started for South Africa with reinforcements. In 1883, on Currie's representations, the British flag was hoisted at St. Lucia Bay in Zululand, which the Germans would have captured a few days later.

In 1877, Paul Kruger and two others came to the United Kingdom as a deputation from the Transvaal Boers to the British government, begging for self-government. They sought Currie's aid. He introduced them to Lord Carnarvon, supporting their appeal; but his advice was not taken. When the South African war broke out in 1899, Currie's services were of great value in the conveyance of troops. His ships carried altogether 172,835 men to and from South Africa, together with thousands of tons of stores, and this without an accident. At the critical juncture in December 1899, when Lord Roberts and Lord Kitchener were ordered to the seat of war, he arranged that the Castle liner which conveyed Lord Roberts from the United Kingdom should be so timed as to meet Lord Kitchener at Gibraltar on his arrival there from Egypt, so that the two generals might travel together to Cape Town.

== Member of Parliament ==
In 1880, Currie had entered parliament in the Liberal interest as one of the members for Perthshire. This seat he held until 1885, when, on the division of the constituency, he was elected for West Perthshire. In 1886, he broke on the Irish home rule question with Gladstone, whom he had hitherto followed. He represented West Perthshire as a Liberal Unionist from 1886 until his retirement from parliament in 1900. He remained on intimate social terms with Gladstone, who was on several occasions between 1883 and 1895 his guest with other distinguished persons on one or other of his ships for summer cruises.

== Glenlyon and Fortingall ==
In 1880 Currie purchased the Garth estate in Perthshire. In 1884, he added to this great property the adjoining Glen Lyon estate, and in 1903 that of Chesthill. He also purchased from Lord Macdonald the island of Scalpay, off Skye, and the adjacent islands of Longa, Guillamon and Pabay.

To his tenants on all these properties Currie proved a generous landlord. New breeds of cattle and sheep were introduced, and large sums expended on the erection and improvement of churches, schools, and cottages. He delighted in sport in his deer-forests, on his grouse moors, and salmon rivers.

== Philanthropy ==
In his later years Currie was munificent in public gifts. In 1904 he gave to University College Hospital, London, £80,000 for a school of final medical studies, and £20,000 for a nurses' home and a maternity students' house. To the University of Edinburgh he gave £25,000 for 'The Donald Currie Lectureship Endowment Fund,' and £6000 for the enlargement of the Students' Union. He also bestowed numerous benefactions on the United Free church of Scotland (he had 'come out' with his minister at the disruption of 1843) and the presbyterian church of England. He restored at a large cost the choir of Dunkeld cathedral. To Belfast, where he spent his boyhood, he was especially generous. To the 'Better Equipment Fund' of Queen's College there he gave £20,000, a gift which 'The Donald Currie Laboratories' there commemorate. He contributed a fourth of the cost of an athletic field for the Belfast students. In the Belfast Royal Academy, his first school, he founded scholarships at a cost of £2000, and, scholarships in the Royal Belfast Academical Institution at an expense of £1000. He helped, too, to pay off the debt of Fisherwick presbyterian church, Belfast, of which his father had been a member.

He died on 13 April 1909 at the Manor House, Sidmouth, Devonshire, and was buried in the churchyard of Fortingal, beside his Highland home.

== Family ==
Currie was married in 1851 to Margaret, daughter of John Miller of Liverpool and Ardencraig, Bute, who survived him. He left three daughters, who erected at a cost of £25,000 a university hall to their father's memory in the University of Cape Town, of which the foundation stone was laid by the duke of Connaught in 1910.

Donald's brother, James Currie (d.1900) ran James Currie & Co and founded the shipping company the Currie Line in Leith. James' son and Donald's nephew James Currie FRSE (1863-1930) was a prominent amateur mineralogist and botanist.

== Later life and honours ==
Currie was the recipient of many honours. In 1880, he was awarded the Fothergill gold medal of the Royal Society of Arts in recognition of 'the improvements which he had introduced into his passenger steamers.' In 1881, he was created C.M.G., and in 1897 G.C.M.G. In 1906, he was made hon. LL.D. at Edinburgh, and received the Freedom of the City of Belfast.

== See also ==
- Currie Cup
- Old Castle Swifts F.C.
- Union-Castle Line

Parliament of the United Kingdom
Preceded by Henry Home-Drummond-Moray	Member of Parliament for Perthshire; 1880–1885	Constituency divided See East Perthshire and West Perthshire
New constituency	Member of Parliament for West Perthshire; 1885–1900	Succeeded by John Stroyan
