= David Charles Erskine =

David Charles Erskine (1866 – 26 May 1922) was a British Liberal Party politician.

== Background ==
Of the landed gentry, he was the son of James Erskine Erskine of Linlathen, near Dundee, and Mary Jane Erskine, née Macnabb. He was educated at Harrow School, France and Germany.

== Career ==
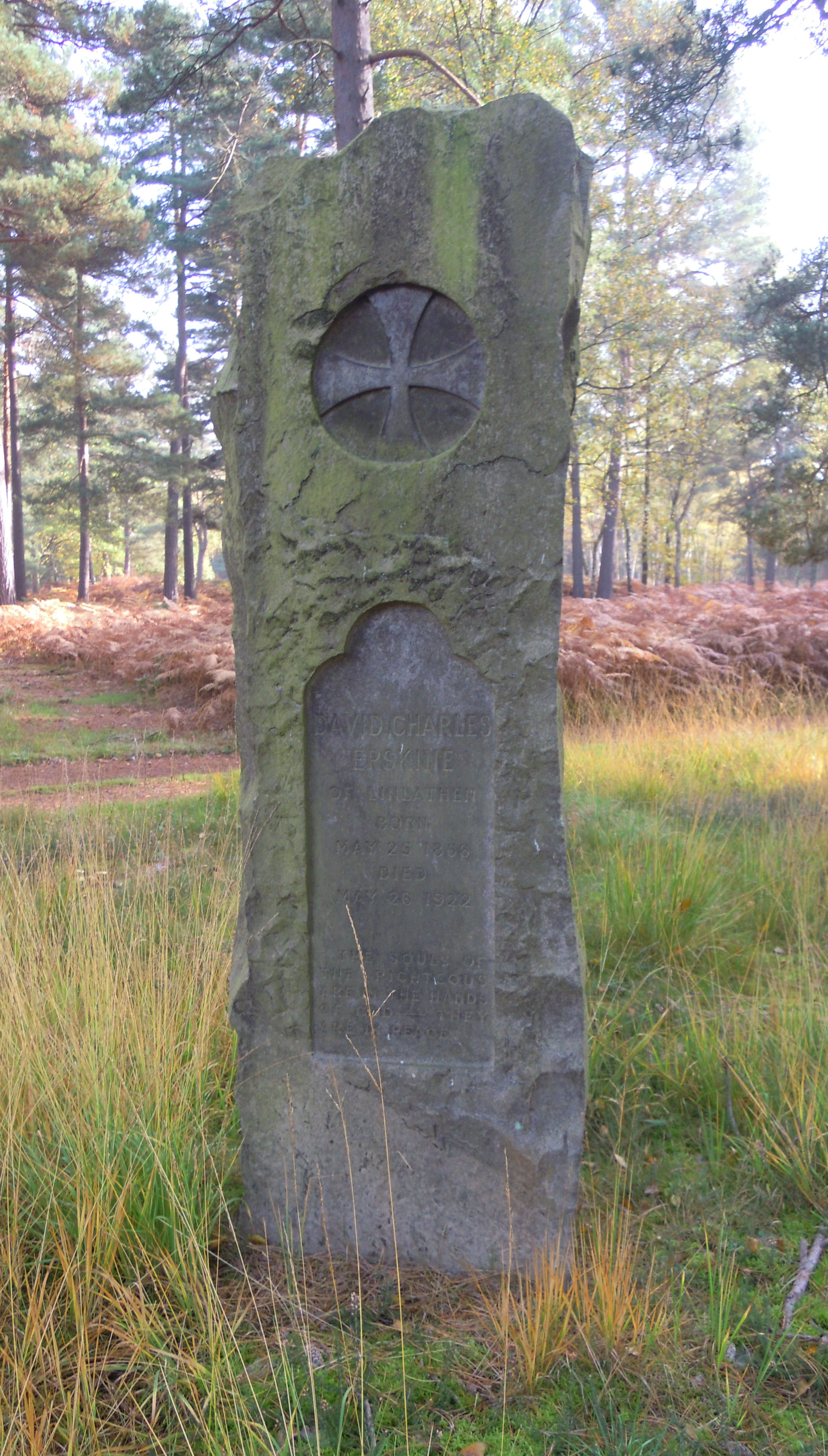
Erskine's grave in Brookwood Cemetery

He was Secretary to the Governor-General of Canada, the Earl of Aberdeen from 1897 to 1898. He was Liberal MP for West Perthshire from 1906 to 1910. He was first elected in 1906, gaining his seat from the Liberal Unionist. He was appointed Parliamentary Secretary to the Secretary for Scotland, John Sinclair in 1906 and served in this position until 1910. He was appointed Chairman of the Board of Trustees for the National Galleries of Scotland in 1908 and continued in this role until his death. He stood down from parliament after one term in January 1910 and did not stand again.

He served as a justice of the peace and was a deputy lieutenant. He was chairman of the Board of the Trustees for the National Galleries of Scotland from 1908.

There is a portrait bust of him by Jacob Epstein. It is in the collection of The McManus: Dundee's Art Gallery and Museum.

He is buried in Brookwood Cemetery.

== John Maynard Keynes ==
John Maynard Keynes added his name to his "sex list" in 1906. Keynes kept two diaries from 1901 to 1915 detailing every sexual encounter he had experienced, what they did, etc.

== Sources ==
- Who Was Who; http://www.ukwhoswho.com
- British parliamentary election results 1885–1918, Craig, F. W. S.

Parliament of the United Kingdom
Preceded by John Stroyan	Member of Parliament for West Perthshire; 1906–January 1910	Succeeded by John Stewart-Murray
