= Perthshire (UK Parliament constituency) =

Parliamentary constituency in the United Kingdom, 1801–1885

- Former county constituency for the House of Commons
- Subdivisions of Scotland: Perthshire

1708–1885
- Seats: One
- Replaced by: Eastern Perthshire; Western Perthshire

Perthshire was a Scottish county constituency of the House of Commons of the Parliament of Great Britain from 1708 to 1801 and of the Parliament of the United Kingdom from 1801 until the Redistribution of Seats Act 1885, representing during that time a seat for one Member of Parliament (MP).

== Creation ==
The British parliamentary constituency was created in 1708 following the Acts of Union, 1707 and replaced the former Parliament of Scotland shire constituency of Perthshire.

== Boundaries ==
The constituency was created to cover the county of Perth, minus the burgh of Perth, which was a component of the Perth Burghs constituency. The Scottish Reform Act 1832 transferred from Perthshire to Clackmannanshire and Kinross-shire the parishes of Tulliallan, Culross and Muckhart and the Perthshire portions of the parishes of Logie and Fossaway.

== History ==
The constituency elected one Member of Parliament (MP) by the first past the post system until the seat was abolished in 1885.

As a result of the Redistribution of Seats Act 1885, the Perthshire constituency was divided to create Eastern Perthshire and Western Perthshire in 1885.

== Members of Parliament ==
Election	Member	Party	Notes
15 June 1708	Dougal Stewart	Tory	Also sat for Buteshire
25 October 1710	Lord James Murray		
10 February 1715	Lord James Murray		Later 2nd Duke of Atholl
By-election, 31 December 1724	David Graeme		
By-election, 28 April 1726	Mungo Haldane		Previously MP for Stirlingshire 1715–22, and for Dunbartonshire 1722–25
12 October 1727	John Drummond		
9 May 1734	Lord John Murray		
21 April 1761	John Murray		
By-election, 23 March 1764	David Graeme		Diplomat and British Army general
By-election, 11 June 1773	James Murray		of Strowan
By-election, 11 April 1794	Thomas Graham		
19 May 1807	Lord James Murray		Later 1st Baron Glenlyon
By-election, 19 March 1812	James Drummond	Tory	
By-election, 6 April 1824	Sir George Murray	Tory	
29 December 1832	The Earl of Ormelie	Whig	Later 2nd Marquess of Breadalbane
By-election, 5 May 1834	Sir George Murray	Conservative	
17 January 1835	Hon. Fox Maule	Whig	
4 August 1837	Viscount Stormont	Conservative	
By-election, 9 March 1840	Henry Home-Drummond	Conservative	
1846	Henry Home-Drummond	Peelite	
16 July 1852	Sir William Stirling, Bt	Conservative	Changed name to Sir William Stirling-Maxwell in March 1866
23 November 1868	Charles Stuart Parker	Liberal	MP for Perth 1878–92
12 February 1874	Sir William Stirling-Maxwell, Bt	Conservative	
By-election, 4 February 1878	Henry Home-Drummond-Moray	Conservative	
5 April 1880	Sir Donald Currie	Liberal	subsequently MP for Western Perthshire
1885	constituency divided. See Eastern Perthshire and Western Perthshire		

== Election results ==
=== Elections in the 1830s ===
General election 1830: Perthshire
Party	Candidate	Votes	%
Tory	George Murray	Unopposed	
Registered electors		239	
Tory hold			

General election 1831: Perthshire
Party	Candidate	Votes	%
Tory	George Murray	Unopposed	
Registered electors		239	
Tory hold			

General election 1832: Perthshire
Party	Candidate	Votes	%
Whig	John Campbell	1,666	60.4
Tory	George Murray	1,093	39.6
Majority		573	20.8
Turnout		2,759	86.8
Registered electors		3,180	
Whig gain from Tory			

Campbell succeeded to the peerage, becoming 2nd Marquess of Breadalbane and causing a by-election.

By-election, 5 May 1834: Perthshire
Party	Candidate	Votes	%	±%
Tory	George Murray	1,464	53.6	+14.0
Whig	Robert Graham	1,268	46.4	−14.0
Majority		196	7.2	N/A
Turnout		2,732	79.8	−7.0
Registered electors		3,425		
Tory gain from Whig		Swing	+14.0	

General election 1835: Perthshire
Party	Candidate	Votes	%	±%
Whig	Fox Maule	1,453	51.5	−8.9
Conservative	George Murray	1,371	48.5	+8.9
Majority		82	3.0	−17.8
Turnout		2,824	76.6	−10.2
Registered electors		3,689		
Whig hold		Swing	−8.9	

General election 1837: Perthshire
Party	Candidate	Votes	%	±%
Conservative	William Murray	1,495	52.0	+3.5
Whig	Fox Maule	1,379	48.0	−3.5
Majority		116	4.0	N/A
Turnout		2,874	64.6	−12.0
Registered electors		4,452		
Conservative gain from Whig		Swing	+3.5	

=== Elections in the 1840s ===
Murray succeeded to the peerage, becoming 4th Earl of Mansfield and causing a by-election.

By-election, 9 March 1840: Perthshire
Party	Candidate	Votes	%	±%
Conservative	Henry Home-Drummond	1,586	58.4	+6.4
Whig	George Drummond Stewart	1,128	41.6	−6.4
Majority		458	16.8	+12.8
Turnout		2,714	64.3	−0.3
Registered electors		4,224		
Conservative hold		Swing	+6.4	

General election 1841: Perthshire
Party	Candidate	Votes	%	±%
Conservative	Henry Home-Drummond	Unopposed		
Registered electors		4,224		
Conservative hold				

General election 1847: Perthshire
Party	Candidate	Votes	%	±%
Peelite	Henry Home-Drummond	Unopposed		
Registered electors		4,187		
Peelite gain from Conservative				

=== Elections in the 1850s ===
General election 1852: Perthshire
Party	Candidate	Votes	%	±%
Conservative	William Stirling	Unopposed		
Registered electors		4,938		
Conservative gain from Peelite				

General election 1857: Perthshire
Party	Candidate	Votes	%	±%
Conservative	William Stirling	Unopposed		
Registered electors		3,415		
Conservative hold				

General election 1859: Perthshire
Party	Candidate	Votes	%	±%
Conservative	William Stirling	Unopposed		
Registered electors		3,368		
Conservative hold				

=== Elections in the 1860s ===
General election 1865: Perthshire
Party	Candidate	Votes	%	±%
Conservative	William Stirling	Unopposed		
Registered electors		3,448		
Conservative hold				

General election 1868: Perthshire
Party	Candidate	Votes	%	±%
Liberal	Charles Stuart Parker	2,046	53.7	New
Conservative	William Stirling-Maxwell	1,767	46.3	N/A
Majority		279	7.4	N/A
Turnout		3,813	78.2	N/A
Registered electors		4,876		
Liberal gain from Conservative		Swing	N/A	

=== Elections in the 1870s ===
General election 1874: Perthshire
Party	Candidate	Votes	%	±%
Conservative	William Stirling-Maxwell	2,554	55.4	+9.1
Liberal	Charles Stuart Parker	2,060	44.6	−9.1
Majority		494	10.8	N/A
Turnout		4,614	83.8	+5.6
Registered electors		5,505		
Conservative gain from Liberal		Swing	+9.1	

Stirling-Maxwell's death caused a by-election.

1878 Perthshire by-election
Party	Candidate	Votes	%	±%
Conservative	Henry Home-Drummond-Moray	2,439	52.0	−3.4
Liberal	Algernon Greville-Nugent	2,255	48.0	+3.4
Majority		184	4.0	−6.8
Turnout		4,694	83.6	−0.2
Registered electors		5,613		
Conservative hold		Swing	-3.4	

=== Elections in the 1880s ===
General election 1880: Perthshire
Party	Candidate	Votes	%	±%
Liberal	Donald Currie	2,764	52.8	+8.2
Conservative	Henry Home-Drummond-Moray	2,472	47.2	−8.2
Majority		292	5.6	N/A
Turnout		5,236	88.5	+4.7
Registered electors		5,918		
Liberal gain from Conservative		Swing	+8.2	

== Notes and references ==
- Leigh Rayment's Historical List of MPs – Constituencies beginning with "P" (part 1)
