= Julià Guillamon =

Catalan writer and literary critic

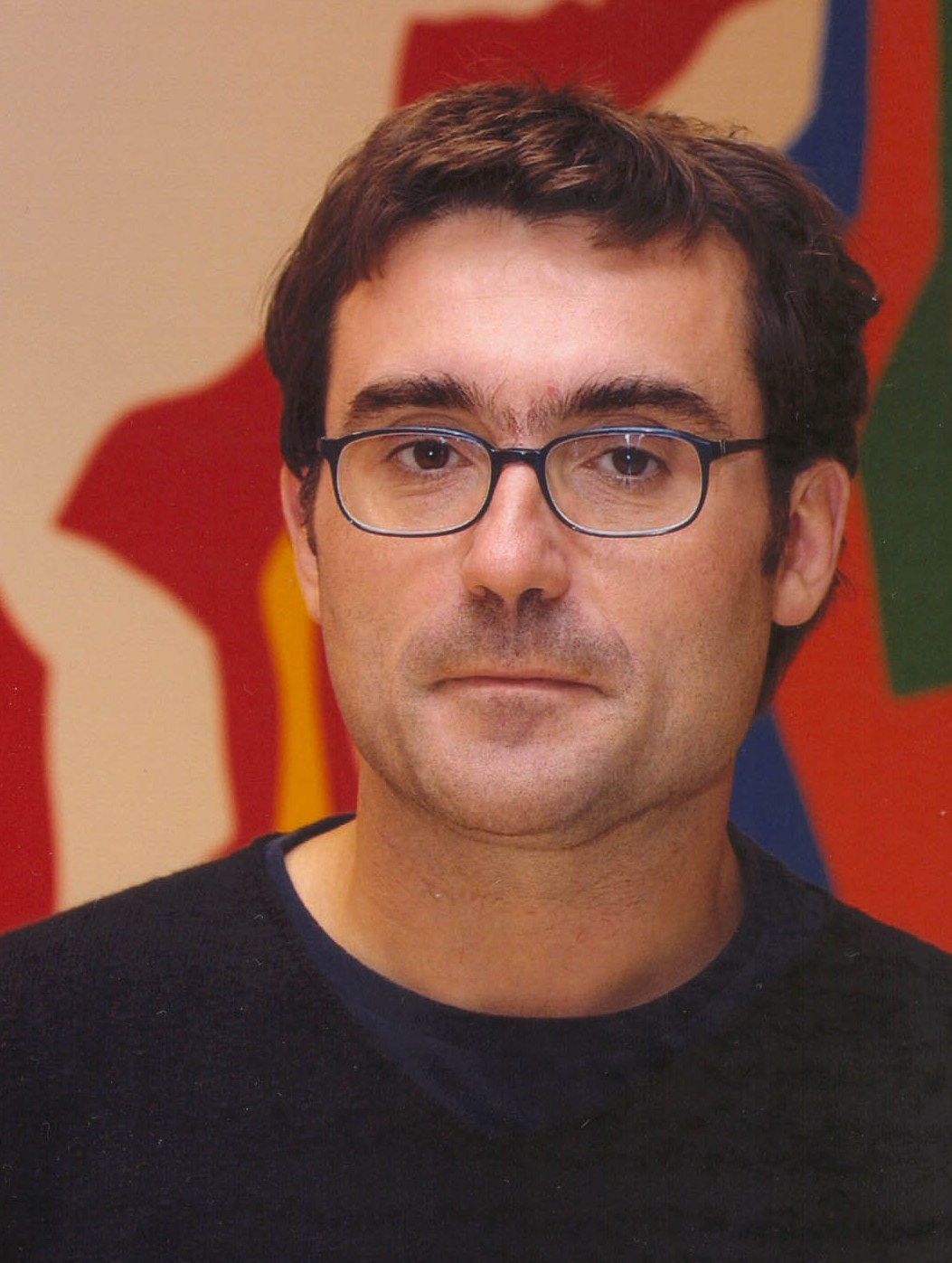
Julià Guillamon

Julià Guillamon is a Catalan writer and literary critic. He was born in Barcelona in 1962.

Guillamon studied Catalan philology at the University of Barcelona. Since 1994, he has been publishing weekly reviews in the newspaper La Vanguardia. His essays have dealt with the image of Barcelona in literature from the period between the 1970s and the 1992 Summer Olympic Games. He has been the curator of several literary exhibitions. One of his projects, The literature of exile, was staged in Barcelona, Buenos Aires, Santiago de Chile, Mexico City and Santo Domingo in the Dominican Republic. He won the 2002 Serra d'Or Critics' Award for essays and the 2006 Octavi Pellissa Award.

== Published books ==
- 1989 Joan Perucho i la literatura fantàstica ISBN 978-84-297-2886-6
- 1991 La fàbrica de fred ISBN 978-84-7596-325-9
- 2001 La ciutat interrompuda. De la contracultura a la Barcelona postolímpica ISBN 84-8264-332-0
- 2008 Uh, Gabirú ISBN 978-84-9787-319-2
- 2008 El dia revolt. Literatura catalana de l'exili. City of Barcelona Prize for essays 2008. Lletra d'Or Prize 2009. ISBN 978-84-9787-340-6
- 2009 Monzó: Com triomfar a la vida ISBN 978-84-8109-847-1
- 2011 La Mòravia ISBN 978-84-8109-930-0
