= Fowlis Wester =

Village in Perth & Kinross, Scotland

Coordinates: 56.396°N 3.738°W

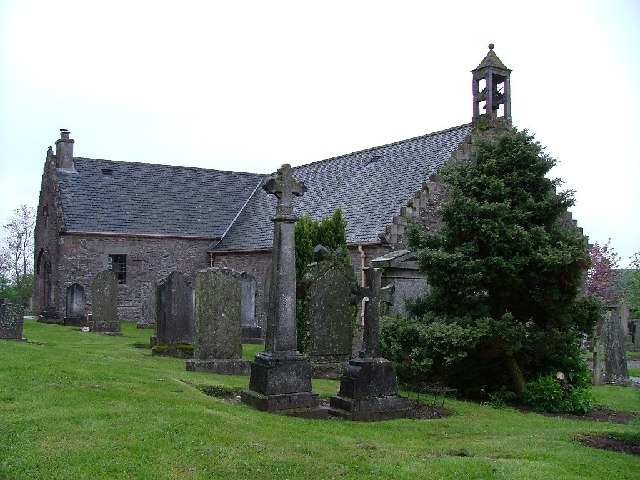
St Bean's Church, Fowlis Wester

Fowlis Wester, also spelt Fowlis-Wester, is a small village in Perth and Kinross, Scotland. It is around 6 kilometres (3.7 mi) east of Crieff and 19 kilometres (12 mi) west of Perth. The parish of Fowlis Wester includes the Abercairny estate to the south-west.

The 13th-century parish church is dedicated to Saint Bean and was restored in 1927. The category B listed building retains original medieval features including a leper's squint. Inside the church is an 8th-century Pictish cross-slab, a replica of which stands in the village square. The slab is carved with a Celtic cross on one side, and the other side bears typically Pictish symbols as well as carvings of animals and people.

== See also ==
- List of listed buildings in Fowlis Wester, Perth and Kinross
