= John Stroyan (politician) =

Scottish politician

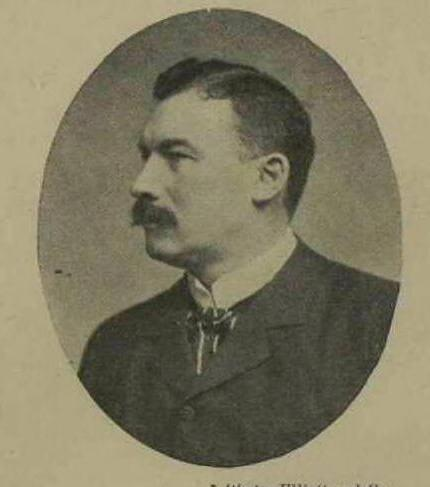
- Born: 1856
- Died: 5 December 1941 (aged 84–85); Lanrick Castle, Doune
- Occupations: Businessman, politician
- Spouse: Edith Dean
- Children: John Robert Stroyan (b 1890); Ronald Strathearn Stroyan (b 1890)
- Parent: John Stroyan

John Stroyan (1856 – 5 December 1941) was a Scottish industrialist and businessman. He was a Liberal Unionist Member of Parliament (MP) for West Perthshire from 1900 to 1906.

== Biography ==
Stroyan was born in 1856, the eldest son of John Stroyan of Kirkchrist, a Galloway gentleman-farmer.

In South Africa, he became a merchant and was due to return to Scotland aged 32 having made a small fortune when he heard of the discovery of gold in the Rand. Staying on, he became associated with Cecil Rhodes and Barney Barnato and amassed a vast fortune. He was "known to be a lecher and a financial swindler, attracting investments to useless mining propositions".

After returning from Africa, he was selected to succeed Sir Donald Currie as candidate for West Perthshire at the 1900 general election. A report at the time described him thus:

Mr. John Stroyan is a sturdy, stalwart, rubicund Scotsman of about forty-five years of age. For about twenty years he was a merchant in South Africa, and was interested with the late Mr. Barnato in many of his most successful enterprises. He is a very rich man, but modest withal, and now that he has retired from business, he intends to devote himself to parliamentary life and the recreations of a country gentleman. He is an ardent sportsman, a good man after the hounds, a more than average shot, an expert fisherman, and no mean golf player. He has yet to make his mark as a public speaker but he has very decided opinions, and no lack of language wherewith to express them.

He won the election, after which he was consulted by Joseph Chamberlain on reconstruction measures after the Boer War. At the following general election, in 1906 he lost the seat to David Charles Erskine in a Liberal landslide.

He died, aged 85, on 5 December 1941, at his home, Lanrick Castle, in Doune, previously the property of the Liberal MP, Sir Robert Jardine. He left an estate of over £200,000.

== Family ==
Stroyan married Edith Dean in 1889. They had two sons, John Robert Stroyan (b 1890) and Ronald Strathearn Stroyan (b 1890). His granddaughter was Sheila Stroyan, a well-known golfer, who with her father, John Robert Stroyan, won the inaugural "Family Foursomes" contest over the Old Course at Burhill Golf Course. She was British girls' champion, and held the Dutch title for two years before competing in the US women's championships at Noroton, Connecticut, in 1939.

Parliament of the United Kingdom
Preceded by Sir Donald Currie	Member of Parliament for West Perthshire; 1900 – 1906	Succeeded by David Charles Erskine
