= Emily Tinne =

British collector of clothes (1886–1966)

- Born: Emily Margaret McCulloch; 21 August 1886; Calcutta, British India
- Died: 12 March 1966 (aged 79); Liverpool, England
- Known for: The Tinne Collection of Clothing
- Spouse: Philip Frederic Tinne (m. 1910; died 1954)

Emily Margaret Tinne (née McCulloch; 21 August 1886 – 12 March 1966) was a British collector of clothes. Raised by a Presbyterian missionary to India, Tinne attended boarding school in England. She trained and worked as a teacher before marrying a wealthy medical doctor in 1910, at which point she started buying clothes from department stores in Bold Street, Liverpool, as well as having bespoke items made by a local dress maker. Her collection, which has been donated to the National Museums Liverpool, contains over 700 items and is the largest from an individual owned by a museum in the United Kingdom. The clothes are of high quality, with many items still unworn in their original tissue paper and boxes, the price tags and delivery information still attached.

== Biography ==
Tinne was born Emily Margaret McCulloch on 21 August 1886 near Calcutta, India. Her father, William McCulloch, was a Presbyterian missionary and principal at a theological college in nearby Chinsurah, West Bengal. Her mother was a stern lady, and the family's lack of means and Presbyterian beliefs made for a frugal upbringing. Tinne had two brothers and a sister, and the four were sent to boarding school in 1893, when Tinne was about seven. During the school holidays, the children would live either with Tinne's maternal aunt in Sevenoaks, Kent or grandparents in Edinburgh. Her parents remained in India until the 1920s.

Tinne studied as a domestic science teacher at Edinburgh School of Cookery, between 1904 and 1906, then moved to Aigburth, Liverpool to live with her maternal uncle, William Brogden Patterson. There she found a teaching role at Liverpool Training School of Cookery & Technical College of Domestic Service, where she remained for three years until 1909. During this period Tinne became engaged to Philip Frederic Tinne, a general practitioner whose family had a history as profitable sugar merchants and ship owners. The couple married at the Welsh Presbyterian Church in Toxteth, Liverpool on 14 July 1910 and moved into a cottage in Aigburth. They had six children, Elspeth, John, Bertha, Helen, Alexine and Philip, along with another who died in infancy, and the growing family meant that they moved into a larger property in 1923 with an extension large enough for Philip's surgery at the rear of the house.

Tinne's husband inherited £161,830 from his father in 1925, equivalent to about £6 million in 2006. Tinne's sons were educated at Eton College, whilst her daughters went to local schools. The family also had at least seven servants and owned the first car in Liverpool.

== The Tinne collection of clothing ==
"Emily's clothes were never ostentatious in style, and indeed were often typical of many of the mainstream fashions of the inter-War period. But due to its sheer volume, her wardrobe is not truly representative of what most middle-class women of the time possessed"

— Mrs Tinne's Wardrobe: A Liverpool Lady's Clothes 1900–1940

Tinne acquired a significant collection of clothes from shops in Bold Street, Liverpool shops and her local dressmaker. The collection comprised both off-the-rail items and bespoke outfits. She also made some clothes, including special outfits for her children's dance shows. The collection is held by National Museums Liverpool, donated in three stages by Emily Tinne's daughter, Alexine. Due to the sheer volume of items, Alexine would put out two tea chests per week, which would be collected by the museum. The collection includes more than 700 items, though many other items could not be accepted due to the low quality. The total collection included over 1000 items. The collection is the largest collection of an individual's clothing owned by a museum in the United Kingdom.

The collection consists of items created between 1900 and 1940 and includes day and evening dresses, coats, underwear and stockings, swimwear, shoes, hats and gloves, baby and children's clothes, but is deficient in the shoes and handbags that would usually accompany a wearable ensemble. In addition, the collection includes Tinne's limited selection of jewellery, her servants' clothes and also some soft furnishings. To provide context, Tinne's collection of fashion magazines and sewing patterns are also included in the collection.

"Emily's motivation for buying clothes in such volume is unclear. Set free, upon her marriage, from the constraints of her Presbyterian up-bringing, and with access to money for the first time in her life, she appears to have embarked upon shopping with a passion."

— Mrs Tinne's Wardrobe: A Liverpool Lady's Clothes 1900–1940

Tinne bought multiple versions of the same item, often leaving them in the original tissue paper, with the original price labels and delivery dates. Many of the higher value items were never worn, possibly because Tinne did not attend functions which would allow them to be due to her husband's evening surgeries. Tinne's daughter, Alexine suggests that Emily may have purchased excess items or high value items that she did not want, to allow the shop assistants to gain commission. This view is backed up by the curator of the exhibition, Pauline Rushton, who describes Tinne's social work in organising widows' pensions or helping unmarried mothers. However, fashion author Linda Grant believes it was more likely that she just enjoyed shopping.

The vast majority of the collection is dated between 1910 and 1940. Few items exist from before her marriage, when she started shopping "almost every afternoon", nor from after the outbreak of World War II, when she appears to have taken on a "make do and mend" attitude, which remained until her death. The size of the collection caused strain between Emily and her husband, along with storage difficulties. The clothes were stored in tea chests and could be found in the couple's en-suite bathroom, the servants' quarters, and were even used to block off part of the cellar to secure other valuables.

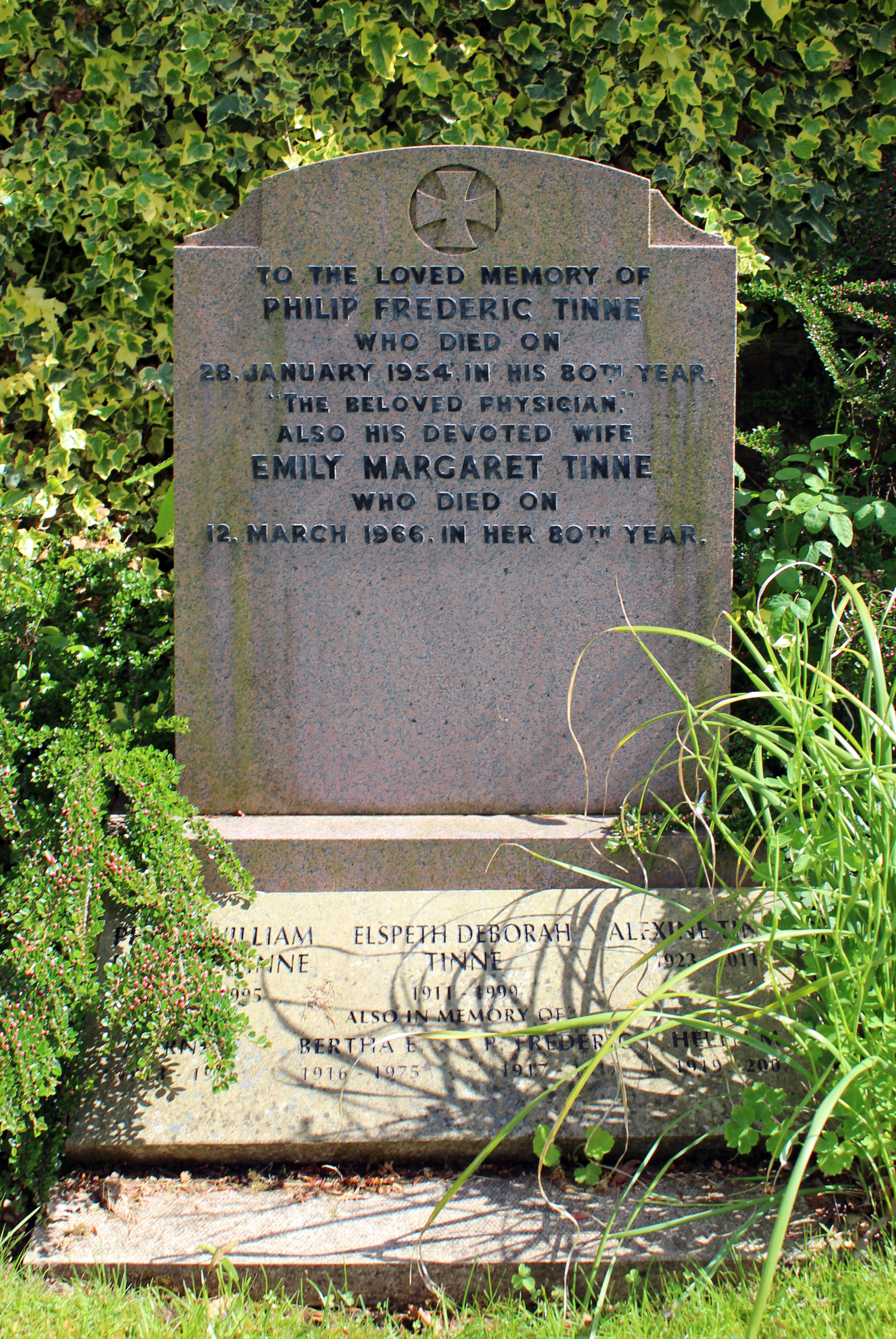
Gravestone of Emily and her husband at St Anne's church, Aigburth

== Sources ==
- Rushton, Pauline (2006). Mrs Tinne's Wardrobe: A Liverpool Lady's Clothes 1900–1940. Liverpool: The Bluecoat Press. ISBN 1-904438-20-2.
