= Henry Home-Drummond-Moray =

Scottish soldier, politician, and landowner

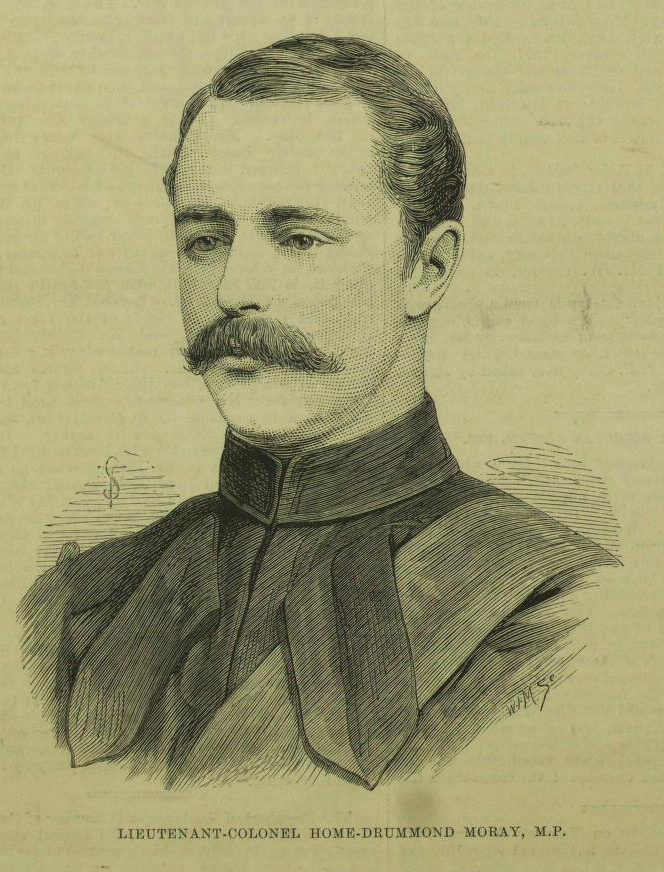

Lt-Col Henry Edward Stirling Home-Drummond-Moray (15 September 1846 – 16 May 1911) was a Scottish soldier, politician, and landowner.

== Life ==
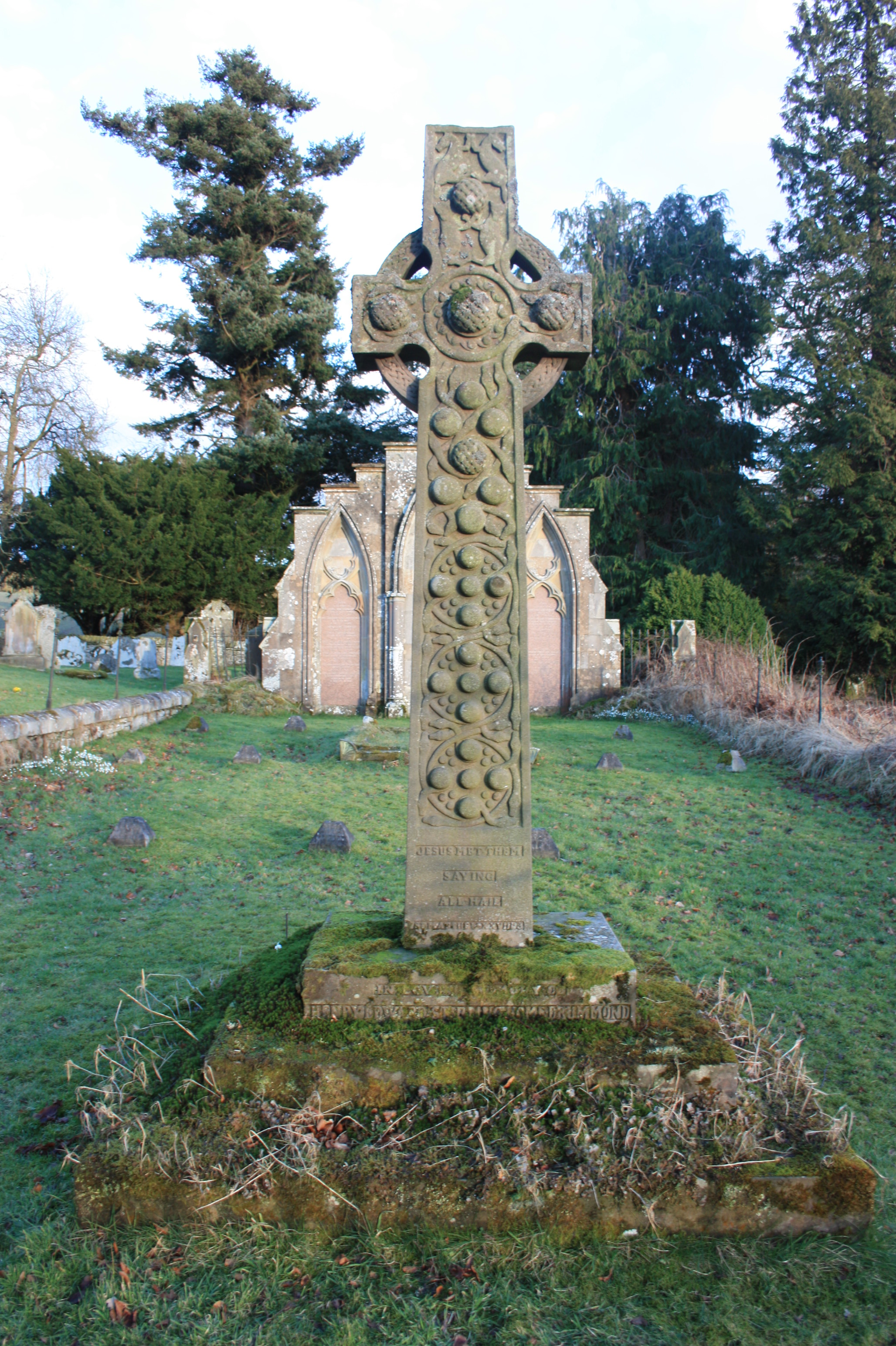
The grave of Lt Col Henry Edward Stirling Home Drummond, Kincardine-in-Menteith

The son of Charles Stirling Home-Drummond-Moray of Abercairny and Blair Drummond and Lady Anne Douglas, daughter of 5th Marquess of Queensberry, he was born in Edinburgh and educated at Eton College. He served in the Scots Guards from 1866 to 1880, rising to rank of Lieutenant-Colonel.

In 1877, he married Lady Georgina Emily Lucy Seymour (1848-1944), daughter of Francis Seymour, 5th Marquess of Hertford.

He dropped the name of Moray on succeeding his father in the estate of Blair Drummond in 1891.

He was a Conservative Member of Parliament for Perthshire from 1878 to 1880, and Vice-Lieutenant and Convener of Perthshire.

He played in goal for the Old Etonians in the replayed FA Cup Final of 1875. His usual position, however, was as a half-back. He also played for the Gitanos, another club open to Etonians.

He is buried at Kincardine-in-Menteith, west of Blair Drummond, in front of the large Home-Drummond family monument.

== Sources ==
Who Was Who

Parliament of the United Kingdom
Preceded by Sir William Stirling-Maxwell, Bt	Member of Parliament for Perthshire; 1878 – 1880	Succeeded by Sir Donald Currie
