= Samuel Sandbach =

British mayor, coroner and slave owner (1769–1851)

Samuel Sandbach (1769 – 26 April 1851) was successively bailiff, coroner and Mayor of Liverpool, as well as High Sheriff of Denbighshire and a Justice of the Peace for Lancashire. He made his fortune as a merchant in a partnership that traded with the West Indies and owned slaves.

== Early life and mercantile career ==
Samuel Sandbach, whose father, Adam, was an innkeeper and farmer, was born in 1769 at Tarporley in Cheshire, England. In 1788, he left England to join his uncle, also called Samuel Sandbach, who had for many years been living and trading in Grenada. Around 1792, after working for some time as a clerk in firm that had been trading since around 1782 in one form or another, the partners were so impressed with the younger Samuel that they invited him to join their ranks.

When trade and thus the income from it went into a downturn, two of the partners – George Robertson, an older, long-established merchant, and Charles Stuart Parker – decided to concentrate on development of existing plantations in Demerara. Parker, who was a nephew of Robertson, returned to Britain after two years. Sandbach and the remaining partner, McInroy, were left to look after the merchanting aspect of the partnership and in 1801 established the Demerara-based firm of McInroy, Sandbach & Co.

Robertson died in 1799, by which time Parker was back in Demerara. He, Sandbach and McInroy all returned to Britain in the same year as McInroy, Sandbach & Co. was founded. They then set up McInroy, Parker & Co. in Glasgow before Sandbach moved to Liverpool to establish another branch of the enterprise. Parker had married a niece of Robertson's in 1797 and Sandbach's move to Liverpool coincided with his own marriage on 15 December 1802 to another niece, Elizabeth Robertson, who was the daughter of a clergyman. In 1813, the prosperous and well-connected Philip Frederick Tinne, a Dutchman of Huguenot descent, joined the Liverpool firm, which became known as the "Rothchilds of Demerara", as a full partner.

Until he formally left the firms in November 1833, when two of his sons took over his interest, Sandbach was a partner in the related businesses of Sandbach, Tinne & Co. (Liverpool), McInroy, Parker & Co. (Glasgow) and McInroy, Sandbach & Co. (Demerara). The enterprise grew to become owners of both ships and plantations and also exporters of coffee, molasses, rum and sugar from the West Indies to the British ports of Liverpool and Glasgow. They were significant slave owners until slavery was abolished in most parts of the British Empire, and from the 1830s until the 1920s were major transporters of indentured labour. Under the terms of the Slave Compensation Act 1837, Sandbach shared compensation of over £35,000 for the liberation of over 500 slaves on two estates he co-owned.

Sandbach was also for some time among the proprietors of the Herculaneum Pottery in Toxteth, Liverpool.

== Public life ==
Sandbach was elected to the Liverpool council in December 1827 following the death of J. B. Hollinshead, who had been at the forefront of an unsuccessful attempt to have him elected a few months earlier when Thomas Leyland had died. He was appointed as Bailiff in October 1828 and as mayor from 1831 to 1832. He became High Sheriff of Denbighshire in 1838, at which time his address was given at Hafodunos, Abergele. He had bought the Hafodunos estate in 1830. (Note: Sandbach was not the only Liverpool slaver to buy land in North Wales. Both Richard Wilding (d. 1820) and John Chambres Jones (d. 1833) had done so.)

He was deputy chairman of the Bank of Liverpool by the mid-1840s, at which time he was also promoting a new company that intended to assist landowners in drainage of their properties.

== Family ==
Samuel and Elizabeth Sandbach had several children, one of whom, Henry Robertson Sandbach, married Margaret Roscoe, a granddaughter of William Roscoe. (Note: There were at least four sons and three daughters. Of the daughters, one married John Abraham Tinne and another Charles Stuart Parker junior, with both of whom Sandbach had been in partnership as a merchant.) He built and briefly lived at a Liverpool mansion, variously described as being in St Anne Street and in Mansfield Street, that then became home to Thomas Colley Porter, another mayor of the borough. He was living at Woodlands in Aigburth, near Liverpool, by 1832 and died there on 26 April 1851. Aside from his Welsh estate at Hafodunos, Sandbach had also bought estates around Calveley Hall and the Handley area of Cheshire.

== See also ==
- Antoinette Sandbach, former Member of Parliament and descendant of Samuel.
