= Guillamon Island =

Island in Highland, Scotland

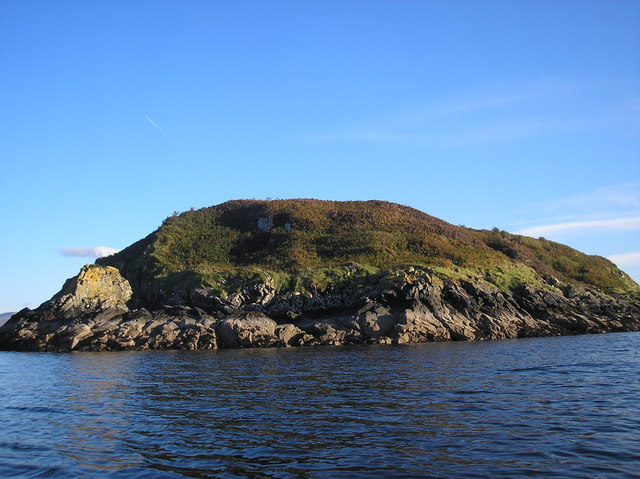
- north shore of Guillamon Island

Location
- Guillamon Island shown within Highland
- OS grid reference: NG6379927276
- Coordinates: 57.274870°N 5.9200086°W

Physical geography
- Island group: Inner Hebrides
- Area: 8 acres (3 ha)
- Highest elevation: 24 m

Administration
- Council area: Highland
- Country: Scotland
- Sovereign state: United Kingdom

Demographics
- Population: 0

Guillamon Island is an uninhabited island south of Scalpay, in the council area of Highland, Scotland. It is 8 acres (3 hectares) in area and 400 yards (350 metres) long in a north-to-south direction. It is entirely greenstone. The name origin is obscure. Guillemon was recorded as being part of the Trap Islands. It was bought for £11,000.
