= Maxwell Macdonald baronets =

Baronetcy in the Baronetage of Nova Scotia

The Maxwell, later Stirling-Maxwell, later Maxwell Macdonald Baronetcy, of Pollok in the County of Renfrew, is a title in the Baronetage of Nova Scotia. It was created on 12 April 1682 for John Maxwell, with remainder to the heirs of the body. In 1707 he was given a new patent extending the remainder to heirs of entail in his lands and estates. Maxwell was Lord Justice Clerk of Scotland from 1699 to 1702, and Rector of the University of Glasgow from 1691 to 1718.

He was a member of an ancient Scottish family that also included the Earls of Nithsdale. One early member of the family, Sir John Maxwell, of Pollok, fought at the Battle of Otterburn in 1388, where he notably captured Sir Ralph Percy, son of the Earl of Northumberland and brother of the commander of the English army, Sir Henry Percy, known as the "Hotspur". The seventh Baronet sat as Member of Parliament for Paisley. The eighth Baronet represented Renfrewshire and Lanarkshire in the House of Commons. The ninth Baronet succeeded as heir of entail and assumed the additional surname of Maxwell. He was Conservative Member of Parliament for Perthshire and was made a Knight of the Thistle. The tenth Baronet sat as Member of Parliament for Glasgow College and was also made a Knight of the Thistle. On his death in 1956 the baronetcy became dormant. His daughter, Dame Anne Maxwell Macdonald (1906–2011) was recognised by Court of the Lord Lyon in 2005 as 11th holder of the baronetcy under the 1707 remainder, and therefore succeeded her father in 1956. (See page B 599 of the Baronetage section of the latest edition of Debrett.) On her death in 2011, she was succeeded by her eldest son John Ronald Maxwell Macdonald, born 1936.

Darcy Maxwell was briefly the wife of Sir Walter Maxwell who died in 1762. She was a leading Methodist.

Archibald Stirling of Keir (1867–1931), second son of the ninth Baronet, was a Brigadier-General in the British Army.

== Maxwell, later Stirling-Maxwell, later Maxwell Macdonald baronets, of Pollok (1682/1707) ==
- Sir John Maxwell, 1st Baronet (1648–1732)
- Sir John Maxwell, 2nd Baronet (1686–1752)
- Sir John Maxwell, 3rd Baronet (1720–1758)
- Sir Walter Maxwell, 4th Baronet (1732–1762)
- Sir John Maxwell, 5th Baronet (1761–1762)
- Sir James Maxwell, 6th Baronet (1735–1785)
- Sir John Maxwell, 7th Baronet (1768–1844)
- Sir John Maxwell, 8th Baronet (1791–1865)
- Sir William Stirling-Maxwell, 9th Baronet (1818–1878)
- Sir John Maxwell Stirling-Maxwell, 10th Baronet (1866–1956)
- Dame Anne Maxwell Macdonald, 11th Baronetess (1906–2011)
- Sir John Ronald Maxwell Macdonald, 12th Baronet (1936–2023)
- Sir John Ranald Maxwell Macdonald, 13th Baronet (born 1965)
