= Sir John Maxwell, 7th Baronet =

Sir John Maxwell, 7th Baronet, of Pollok (31 October 1768 – 30 July 1844) was the Member of Parliament (MP) for Paisley from 10 December 1832 until resigning in 1834.

The eldest son of Sir James Maxwell, 6th Baronet, of Pollok and Frances Colquhoun, daughter of Robert Colquhoun of St. Christopher's. Sir John, succeeded his father to the barony in 1785. He married Hannah or Anne Gardiner, daughter of Richard Gardiner, of Aldborough, Suffolk, and had issue, one son, Sir John Maxwell, 8th Baronet, and two daughters, Harriet Maxwell, who died in 1812, and Elizabeth Maxwell, wife of Archibald Stirling, Esq., of Keir, the parents of Sir William Stirling-Maxwell, 9th Baronet, of Pollok.

== Death ==
On Tuesday the 30th of July 1844, Sir John arose at his usual hour and complained of some mild chest pain. After breakfast as he proceeded through the lobby of Pollok House to take carriage with his friend and relative, Mr Wallace of Kelly his head suddenly drooped and he collapsed. He was immediately attended by his faithful body servant of forty-five years', Mr Archibald McDonald and died soon after.

Parliament of the United Kingdom
| New constituency | Member of Parliament for Paisley; 1832–1834 | Succeeded by Sir Daniel Keyte Sandford |
Baronetage of Nova Scotia
| Preceded by James Maxwell | Baronet (of Pollok); 1785–1844 | Succeeded by John Maxwell |
