= 1818 in Iran =

- Decades
- See also: Other events of 1818; Years in Iran

The following lists events that happened during 1818 in Qajar era.

== Incumbents ==
- Monarch: Fath-Ali Shah Qajar
