= Sir John Maxwell, 8th Baronet =

British politician

Sir John Maxwell Bt FRSE
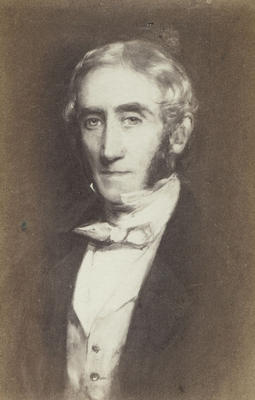
- Thomas Annan photograph of a portrait of Sir John Maxwell, 8th Baronet of Pollok, painting by James R. Swinton

Member of Parliament for Lanarkshire
- In office 1832–1837
- Preceded by: Charles Douglas
- Succeeded by: Alexander Lockhart

Member of Parliament for Renfrewshire
- In office 1818–1830
- Preceded by: Archibald Spiers
- Succeeded by: Sir Michael Shaw-Stewart, 6th Baronet

Personal details
- Born: John Maxwell Stirling-Maxwell; 12 May 1791 Pollok House, Eastwood, Renfrewshire, Scotland
- Died: 6 June 1865 (aged 74) Pollok House, Eastwood, Renfrewshire, Scotland
- Party: Whigs
- Spouse: Lady Matilda Harriet Bruce
- Education: Westminster School; University of Oxford; University of Edinburgh

Sir John Maxwell, 8th Baronet, FRSE (12 May 1791 – 6 June 1865) was a Scottish landowner and politician.

== Life ==
Maxwell was born at Pollok House, Renfrewshire on 12 May 1791 the son of Hannah Anne Gardiner and her husband, Sir John Maxwell, 7th Baronet. He was educated at Westminster School in London. He then studied at the University of Oxford and the University of Edinburgh.

He was a member of Parliament for Renfrewshire between the years of 1818 and 1830. Later he represented Lanarkshire, between the years of 1832 and 1837.

He succeeded to the baronetcy in 1844 on the death of his father.

In 1854 he was elected a Fellow of the Royal Society of Edinburgh his proposer being Thomas Makdougall Brisbane.

He was influential in the restoration of Haggs Castle in 1860.

In 1864 he was one of the main funders behind a new church in Glasgow which was later known as the Maxwell Church.

== Family ==
In 1839 he married Lady Matilda Harriet Bruce (d. 1857). They did not have children.

Baronetage of Nova Scotia
Preceded by John Maxwell	Baronet (of Pollok); 1844–1865	Succeeded by William Stirling-Maxwell
