= Alexander Lockhart =

British Conservative politician (1806-1861)

Alexander Macdonald Lockhart

Member of Parliament for Lanarkshire
- In office 24 July 1837 – 23 June 1841
- Preceded by: John Maxwell
- Succeeded by: William Lockhart

Personal details
- Born: July 1806
- Died: 27 October 1861 (aged 55) Galgorm Castle, Galgorm, County Antrim, Ireland
- Party: Conservative

Alexander Macdonald Lockhart (July 1806 – 27 October 1861) was a British Conservative politician and landowner.

Lockhart was born in 1806, the third son of Sir Alexander Lockhart, 1st Baronet (died 1816), himself Member of Parliament (MP) for Berwick-upon-Tweed and a member of the extended Lockharts of Lee family.

Lockhart was elected Conservative MP for Lanarkshire at the 1837 general election on 24 July 1837 and held the seat until the dissolution of the 13th United Kingdom parliament on 23 June 1841. He served as a magistrate.

He had four siblings; two sisters and two older brothers, the latter being Sir Charles Lockhart, second baronet (1799–1832) and Sir Norman Lockhart, third baronet (1802–1849). The fourth baronet, Sir Norman Macdonald Lockhart (1845–1870), was his nephew. (Note: See: Lockhart baronets#Lockhart baronets, of Lee (1806))

He died on 27 October 1861, aged 55, after a few days illness, while visiting John Young at Galgorm Castle, County Antrim.

He was a friend of and advisor to painter Joseph Severn and his family.

== Notes ==
Parliament of the United Kingdom
Preceded by John Maxwell	Member of Parliament for Lanarkshire; 1841–1841	Succeeded by William Lockhart
