= Harry Watt (politician) =

British barrister and Liberal MP (1863–1929)

Henry Anderson Watt

Henry Anderson Watt (28 February 1863 – 2 December 1929) was a British barrister and Liberal Party Member of Parliament, who represented Glasgow College from 1906 to 1918.

From Glasgow, Watt was educated at Glasgow High School, Bellahouston Academy, and the University of Glasgow (MA), Watt was called to the English bar at Gray's Inn in 1896. He did not practice at the bar but went in business in Glasgow, following his father, as a yarn merchant. He was a JP for Argyllshire.

Watt was returned for Glasgow College in 1906 and held the seat until the 1918 general election, when his constituency was abolished as part of electoral reform. Watt stood for Glasgow Maryhill but came bottom of the poll.

He later contested Govan at the 1923 general election, but Watt finished last place out of just two candidates, failing to defeat the sitting Labour MP Neil Maclean in what was a safe seat for the Labour Party.

His son was the film director Harry Watt.

Parliament of the United Kingdom
Preceded by John Stirling-Maxwell	Member of Parliament for Glasgow College; 1906–1918	constituency abolished
