= 1818 =

1818 in various calendars
- Gregorian calendar: 1818; MDCCCXVIII
- Ab urbe condita: 2571
- Armenian calendar: 1267; ԹՎ ՌՄԿԷ
- Assyrian calendar: 6568
- Balinese saka calendar: 1739–1740
- Bengali calendar: 1224–1225
- Berber calendar: 2768
- British Regnal year: 58 Geo. 3 – 59 Geo. 3
- Buddhist calendar: 2362
- Burmese calendar: 1180
- Byzantine calendar: 7326–7327
- Chinese calendar: 丁丑年 (Fire Ox); 4515 or 4308 — to — 戊寅年 (Earth Tiger); 4516 or 4309
- Coptic calendar: 1534–1535
- Discordian calendar: 2984
- Ethiopian calendar: 1810–1811
- Hebrew calendar: 5578–5579
- Hindu calendars
- Vikram Samvat: 1874–1875
- Shaka Samvat: 1739–1740
- Kali Yuga: 4918–4919
- Holocene calendar: 11818
- Igbo calendar: 818–819
- Iranian calendar: 1196–1197
- Islamic calendar: 1233–1234
- Japanese calendar: Bunka 15 / Bunsei 1 (文政元年)
- Javanese calendar: 1745–1746
- Julian calendar: Gregorian minus 12 days
- Korean calendar: 4151
- Minguo calendar: 94 before ROC 民前94年
- Nanakshahi calendar: 350
- Thai solar calendar: 2360–2361
- Tibetan calendar: མེ་མོ་གླང་ལོ་ (female Fire-Ox); 1944 or 1563 or 791 — to — ས་ཕོ་སྟག་ལོ་ (male Earth-Tiger); 1945 or 1564 or 792

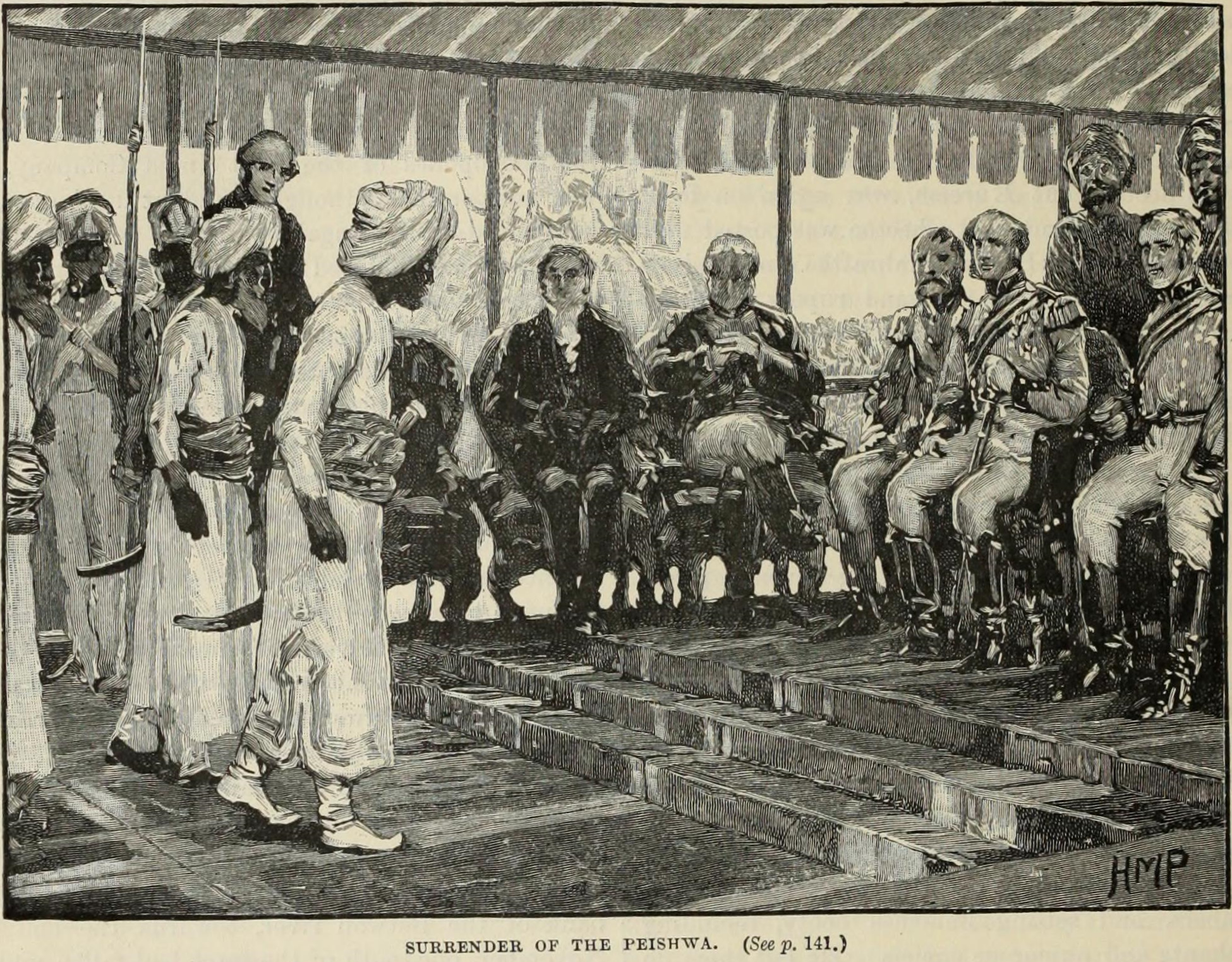
June 3: The Peshwar Baji Rao II of the Maratha Confederacy surrenders India to John Malcolm of the British East India Company.

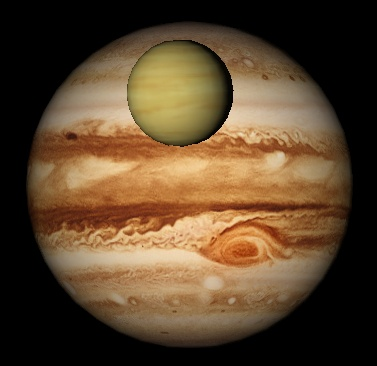
January 3 (21:52 UTC): Venus occults Jupiter for the last planetary occultation until 2065.

1818 (MDCCCXVIII) was a common year starting on Thursday of the Gregorian calendar and a common year starting on Tuesday of the Julian calendar, the 1818th year of the Common Era (CE) and Anno Domini (AD) designations, the 818th year of the 2nd millennium, the 18th year of the 19th century, and the 9th year of the 1810s decade. As of the start of 1818, the Gregorian calendar was 12 days ahead of the Julian calendar, which remained in localized use until 1923.

== Events ==
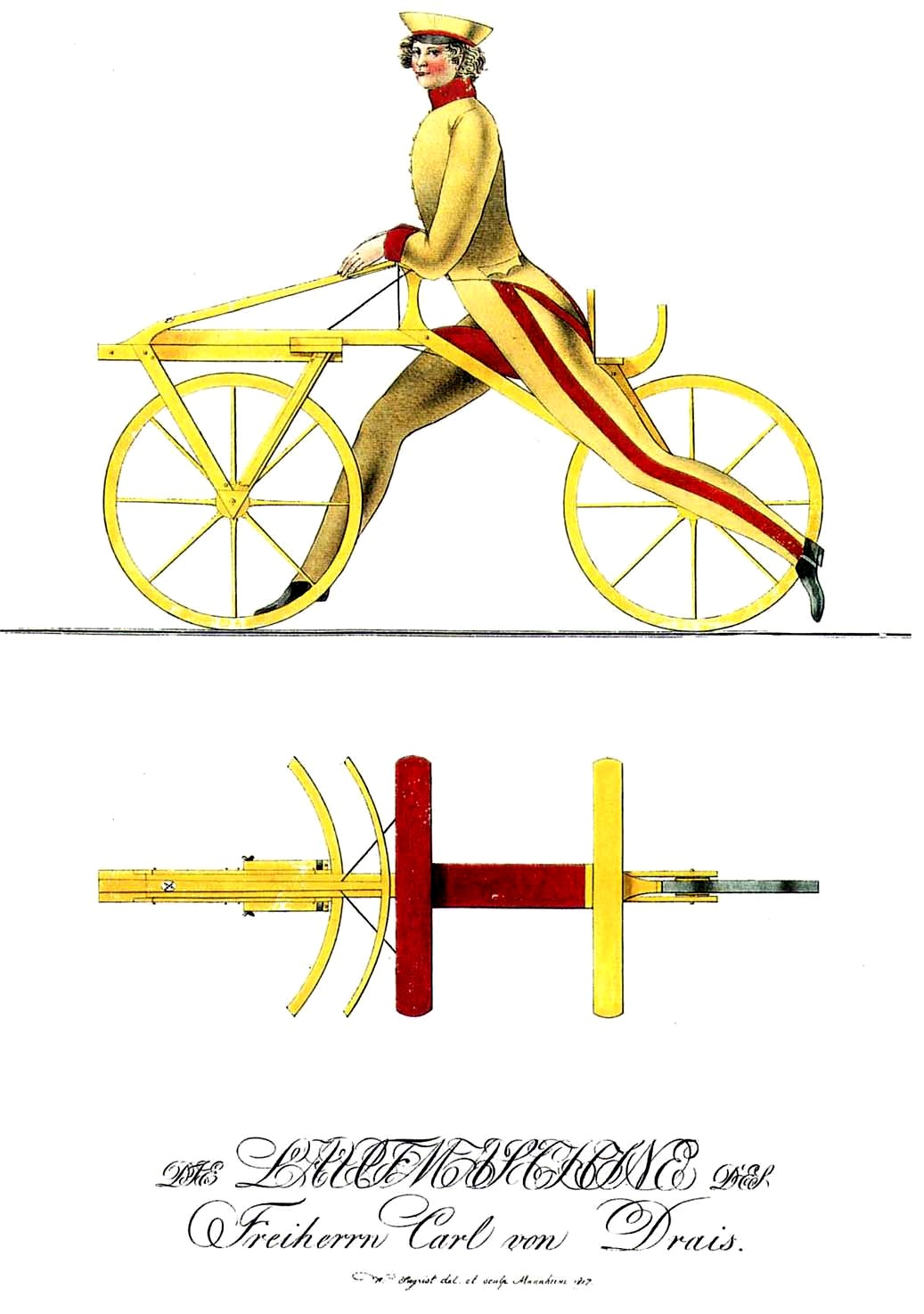
Original Laufmaschine of 1817 made to measure.

=== January–March ===
- January 1
  - Battle of Koregaon: Troops of the British East India Company score a decisive victory over the Maratha Empire.
  - English author Mary Shelley publishes the novel Frankenstein anonymously.
- January 3 (21:52 UTC) – Venus occults Jupiter. It is the last occultation of one planet by another before November 22, 2065.
- January 6 – The Treaty of Mandeswar brings an end to the Third Anglo-Maratha War, ending the dominance of Marathas, and enhancing the power of the British East India Company, which controls territory occupied by 180 million Indians.
- January 12 – The Dandy horse (Laufmaschine bicycle) is patented by Karl Drais in Mannheim.
- February 3 – Jeremiah Chubb is granted a British patent for the Chubb detector lock.
- February 4 – Writer Walter Scott finds the Honours of Scotland in Edinburgh Castle.
- February 5 – Upon his death, King Charles XIII of Sweden (Charles II of Norway) is succeeded on both thrones by his adoptive son Charles XIV/III John, starting the Royal House of Bernadotte.
- February 11 – Marie André Cantillon attempts to assassinate the Duke of Wellington in Paris.
- February 12 – Chilean Declaration of Independence from Spain is proclaimed in Chile.
- March 15 – First Seminole War: General Andrew Jackson and his American army invade Florida.
- March 22 – Easter Sunday in Western Christianity falls on its earliest possible date. In Western Christianity, it will not occur on this date again until 2285.

=== April–June ===
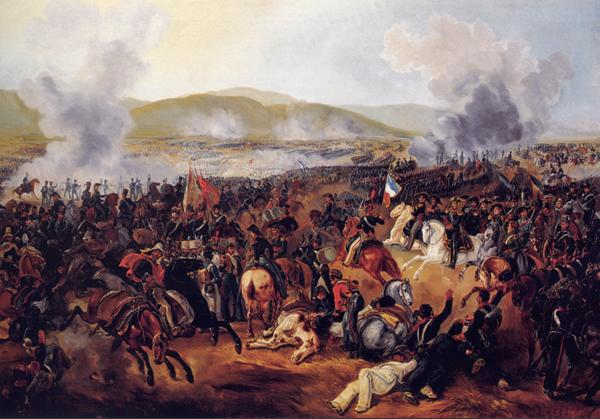
April 5: Battle of Maipú

- April 1 – First Seminole War – Battle of Miccosukee, Florida: General Andrew Jackson defeats chief Kinhagee.
- April 4 – The United States Congress adopts the flag of the United States as having thirteen red and white stripes, and one star for each state (twenty), with additional stars to be added whenever a new state is added to the Union.
- April 5 – Chilean War of Independence – Battle of Maipú: Patriot rebels, led by José de San Martín, decisively defeat the Spanish Royalists.
- April 7 – Brooks Brothers, the oldest men's clothier in the United States, opens its first store on the northeast corner of Catherine and Cherry Streets in New York City, where the later South Street Seaport stands.
- April 14–August 9 – The United States Survey of the Coast operations is suspended.
- April 18 – John Ross sets sail on his ship, the Isabella, in search of the Northwest Passage.
- May 11
  - Charles XIV of Sweden–Norway is crowned king of Sweden.
  - The Old Vic Theatre is founded (as the Royal Coburg Hall) in London.
  - The Westmorland Gazette is first published at Kendal in the Lake District of England; in July, Thomas De Quincey will begin a 16-month term as editor.
- June 3 – Baji Rao II, Peshwa of the Maratha Confederacy, surrenders to Sir John Malcolm of the British East India Company, bringing an end to the Third Anglo-Maratha War and giving the company control of almost all of modern-day India.
- June 10 – The British Parliament is dissolved by the Prime Minister Lord Liverpool, and new elections are scheduled for August 4 for the House of Commons.
- June 11 – Prince William, Duke of Clarence and St Andrews, third oldest son of King George III and the future King William IV of the United Kingdom, marries Adelaide of Saxe-Meiningen.
- June 18 – At least 34 people are killed in Switzerland, when the melting of a glacier releases the natural dam of Lac de Mauvoisin, sending the waters of the lake and the Dranse River into the valley of Bagnes.
- June – Battle of Kafir Qala: The Afghans defeat a Persian invasion.

=== July–September ===
- July 1 – After a war that began on November 5, 1817, the forces of the East India Company defeat Baji Rao II in battle and acquire control over the Maratha Empire.
- July 3 – English poet Lord Byron, resident in Italy, begins work on his satirical epic Don Juan. Although he completes the first canto by September 19, he will die in 1824 before he can finish the poem, after completing 16 cantos and working on the 17th.
- July 11 – The Bank of the United States reverses its policy of expanding credit, and sends notices to its borrowers nationwide demanding immediate repayment of balances due; the defaults during the next six months will trigger the Panic of 1819.
- July 15 – U.S. President James Monroe convenes a cabinet meeting, to discuss whether General Andrew Jackson's unauthorized invasion and conquest of Spanish Florida should be disavowed by the White House. Secretary of State John Quincy Adams persuades the President that the action is justifiable, in stopping terror caused by the Seminole tribes.
- July 29 – French physicist Augustin-Jean Fresnel submits his prizewinning "Memoir on the Diffraction of Light" to the French Academy of Sciences, precisely accounting for the limited extent to which light spreads into shadows, and thereby demolishing the oldest objection to the wave theory of light.
- July 31 – The first newspaper in Cleveland, Ohio is issued by publisher Andrew Logan. Using the original name of the small settlement (population 172), Logan names the weekly paper The Cleaveland Gazette & Commercial Register.
- August 1 – A separate Topographical Bureau of the United States Department of War is established.
- August 4 – 1818 United Kingdom general election for the House of Commons. The Tory Party, led by Prime Minister Robert Jenkinson, retains its control of the government but loses some seats.
- September 9 - Ottoman Empire defeats the First Saudi State and captures Abdullah bin Saud Al Saud
- September 23 – Border markers are formally installed for the European territory of Moresnet.
- September – Sir Stamford Raffles sets out to visit Lord Hastings, Governor-General of India, to gain his approval to establish a trading station at the southern tip of the Malay Peninsula (modern-day Singapore).

=== October–December ===
- October 5 – Claudine Thévenet (known as Mary of St. Ignatius) founds the Roman Catholic order Religious of Jesus and Mary in Lyon, France.
- October 20 – A treaty between the U.S. and the United Kingdom establishes the boundary between the U.S. and British North America as the 49th parallel, from the Lake of the Woods to the Rocky Mountains, also creating the Northwest Angle.
- November 11 – Anglo-Chinese College is founded by Robert Morrison in Malacca (later renamed Ying Wa College).
- November 16 – The Saint Louis Academy, which later becomes Saint Louis University, is founded by Reverend Louis William Valentine Dubourg in the United States.
- December 3 – Illinois is admitted as the 21st U.S. state.
- December 24 – The Christmas carol "Silent Night" (Stille Nacht), with words by the priest Josef Mohr, set to music by organist Franz Xaver Gruber, is first performed at St. Nikolaus Parish Church, in Oberndorf bei Salzburg, Austria.

=== Date unknown ===
- Catholic–Orthodox clash in Aleppo.
- Hamburg Temple disputes between branches of Judaism intensify in Germany.
- The first edition of the Farmers' Almanac is published in the United States.
- The first Serbian dictionary is published by Vuk Karadžić.
- Besses o' th' Barn Brass Band is formed in Whitefield, near Manchester by this date.
- The Barakzai brothers expel Mahmud Shah and the Sadozais out of Afghanistan, dividing the provinces up amongst themselves.
- Akure–Benin War: Benin invasion of Akure.

== Births ==
=== January–June ===
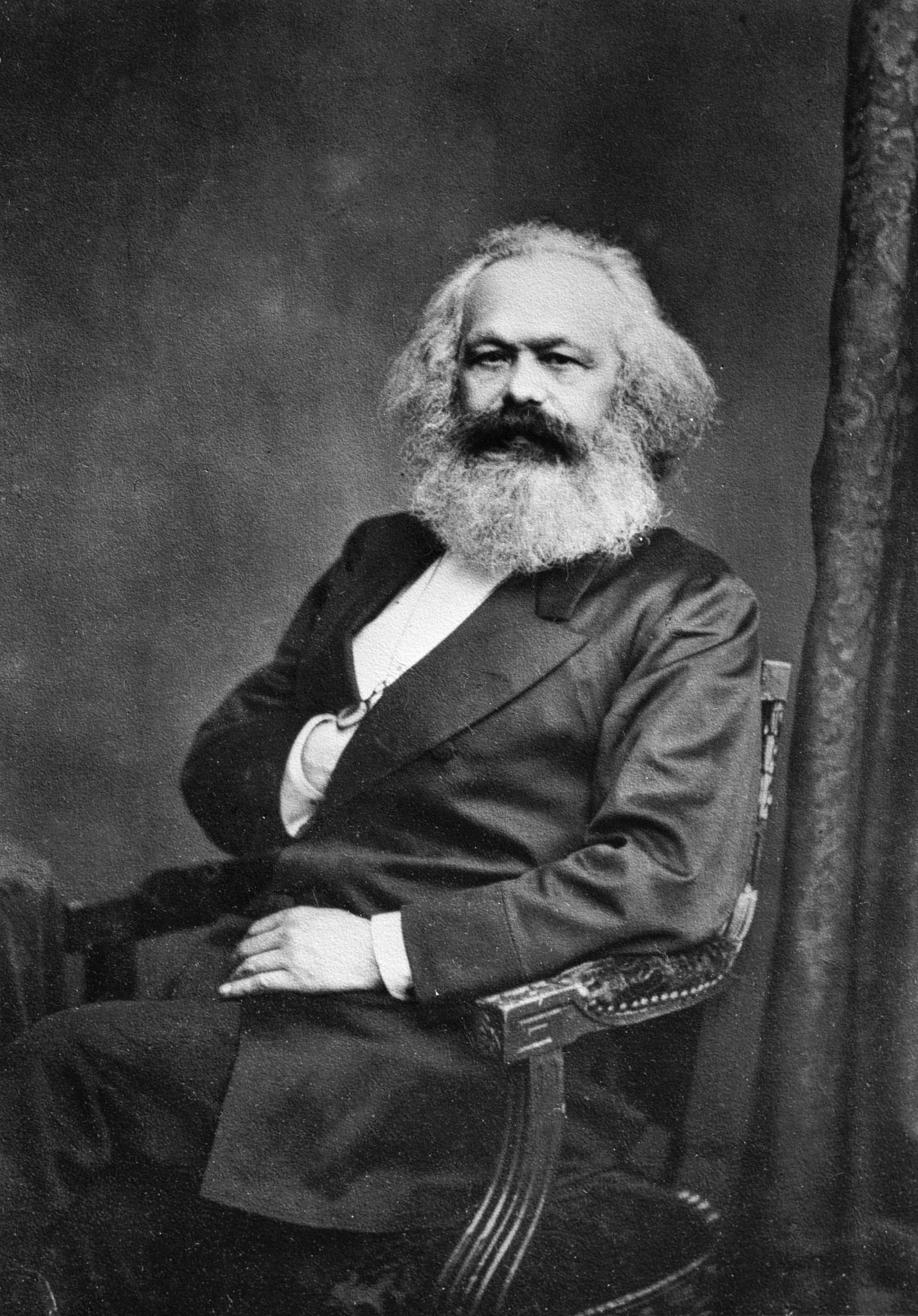
Karl Marx

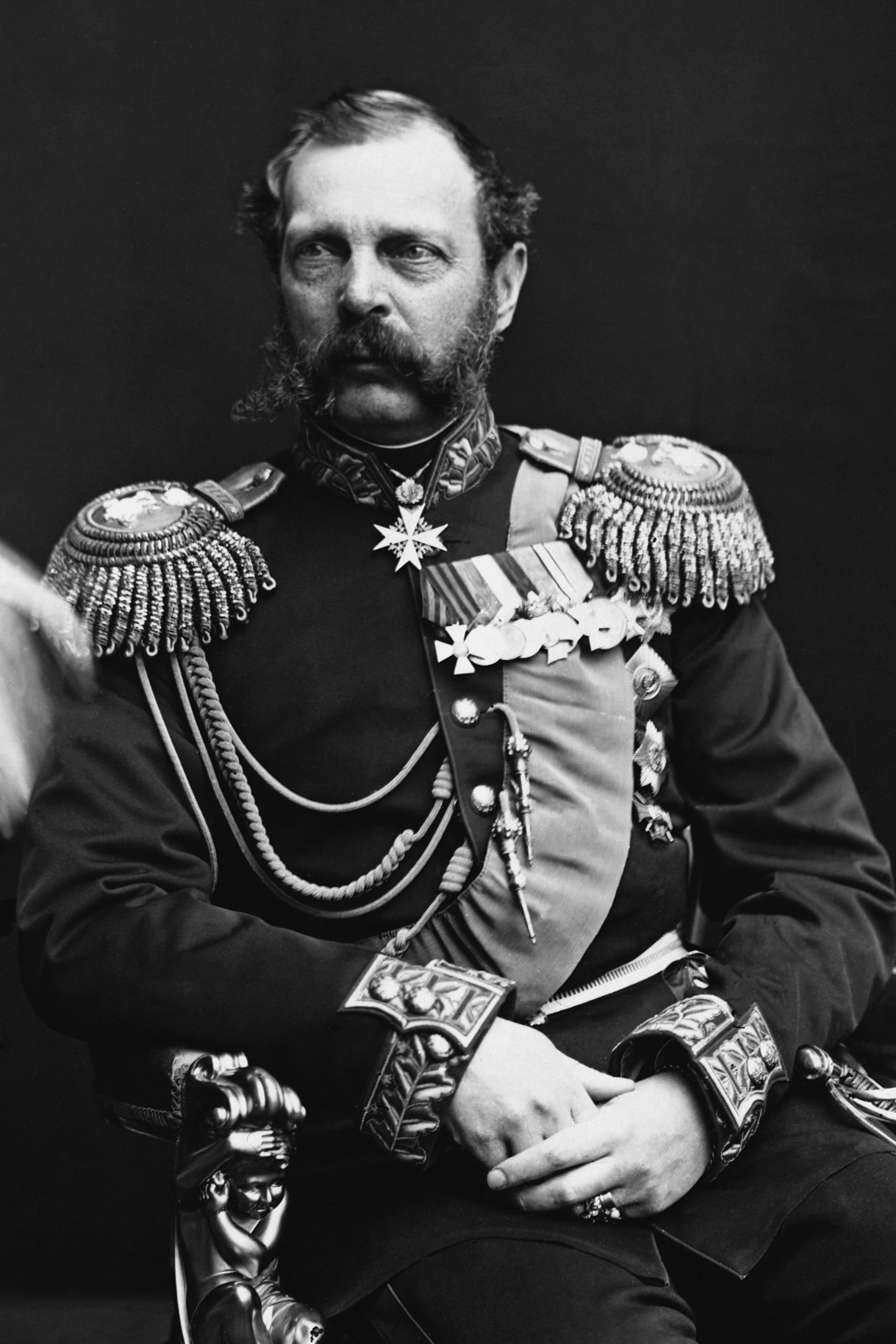
Alexander II of Russia

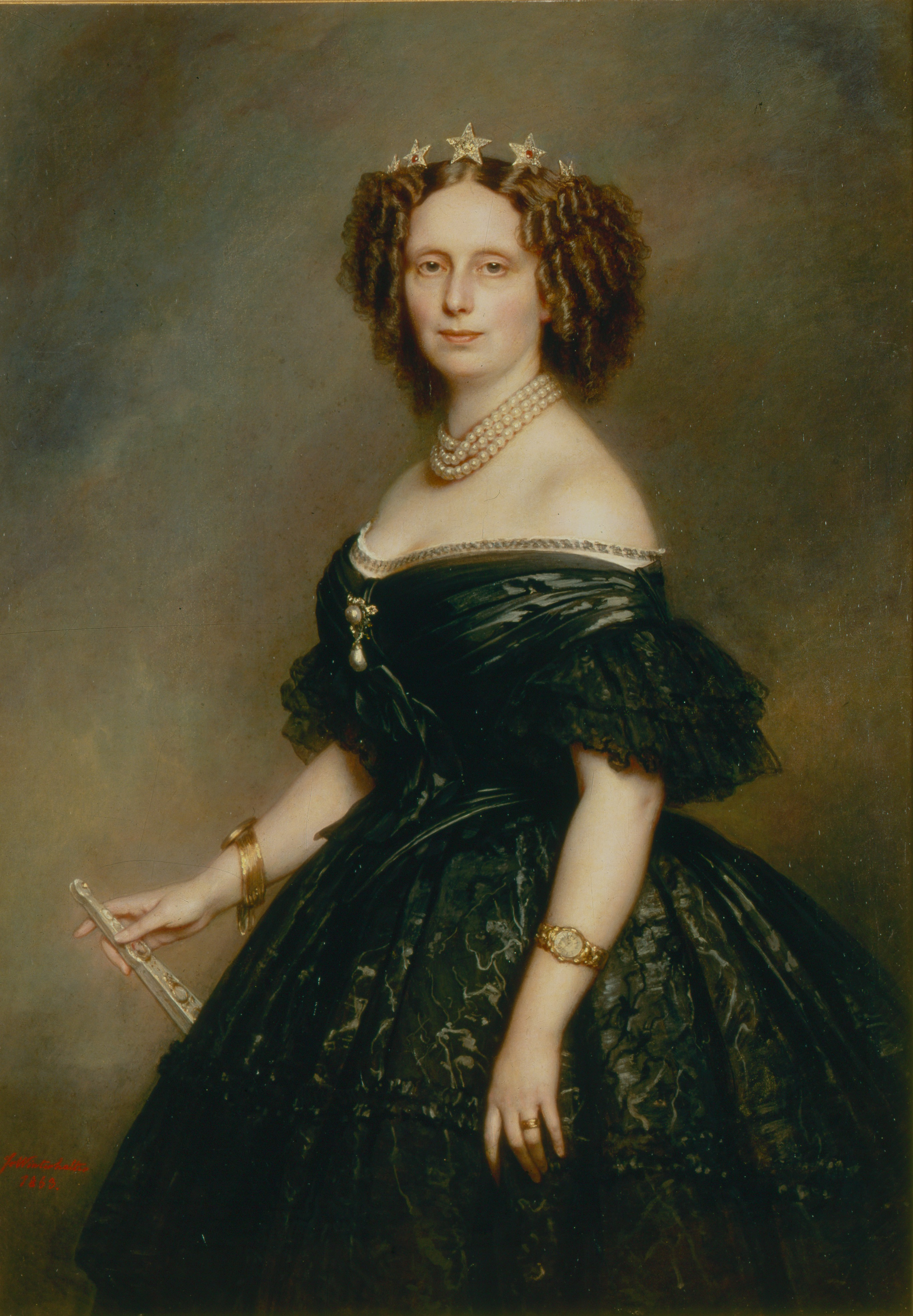
Sophie of Württemberg

- January 1 – J. P. C. Emmons, American attorney and politician (d. 1877)
- January 30 – Artúr Görgey, Hungarian military general, politician (d. 1916)
- February 4 – Emperor Norton, San Francisco eccentric and visionary (d. 1880)
- February 13 – Angelica Singleton Van Buren, Acting First Lady of the United States (d. 1877)
- February 14 – Frederick Douglass (his day of birth was never established; he adopted this date), American abolitionist author, statesman (d. 1895)
- February 18 – Pedro Figueredo, Cuban poet, musician, and freedom writer (d. 1870)
- March 11 – Henri Étienne Sainte-Claire Deville, French chemist (d. 1881)
- March 22 – John Ainsworth Horrocks, English-born explorer of South Australia (d. 1846)
- March 24 – William E. Le Roy, American admiral (d. 1888)
- March 28 – Wade Hampton III, Confederate soldier and South Carolinian politician (d. 1902)
- April 4 – Thomas Mayne Reid, Irish-American novelist (d. 1883)
- April 6 – Aasmund Olavsson Vinje, Norwegian journalist and poet (d. 1870)
- April 8 –
  - King Christian IX of Denmark (d. 1906)
  - August Wilhelm von Hofmann, German chemist (d. 1892)
- April 17 – Emperor Alexander II of Russia (d. 1881)
- April 19 – Sir Arthur Elton, 7th Baronet, English writer, Liberal Party politician (d. 1883)
- May 5 – Karl Marx, German political philosopher, co-author of The Communist Manifesto (d. 1883)
- May 27 – Amelia Bloomer, American dress reformer, women's rights activist (d. 1894)
- June 3 – Louis Faidherbe, French general and colonial administrator (d. 1889)
- June 17
  - Sophie of Württemberg, Dutch queen (d. 1877)
  - Charles Gounod, French composer (d. 1893)
- June 18 – Angelo Secchi, Italian astronomer (d. 1878)

=== July–December ===
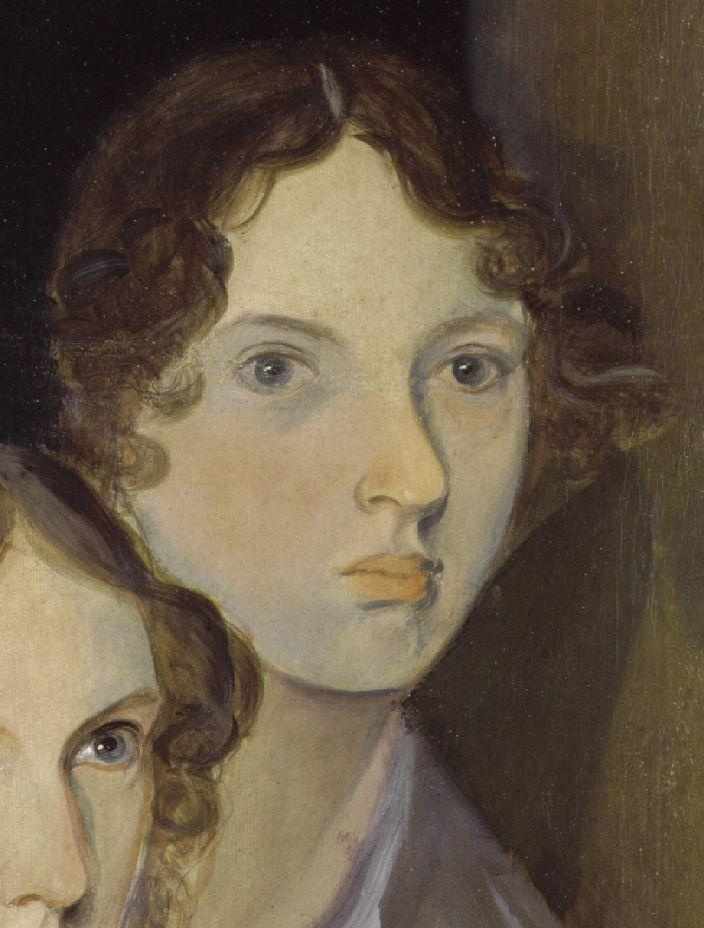
Emily Brontë

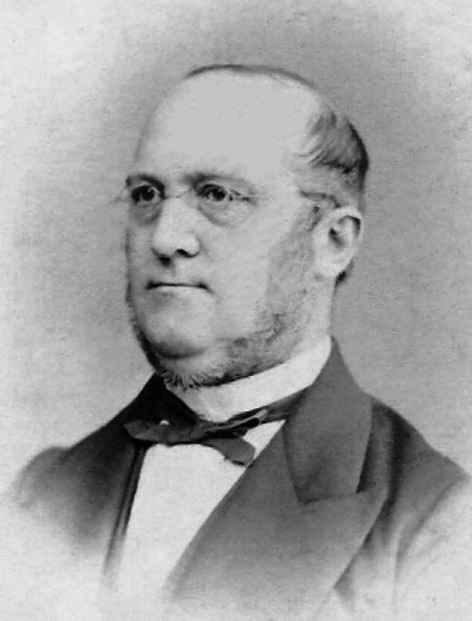
Adolph Wilhelm Hermann Kolbe

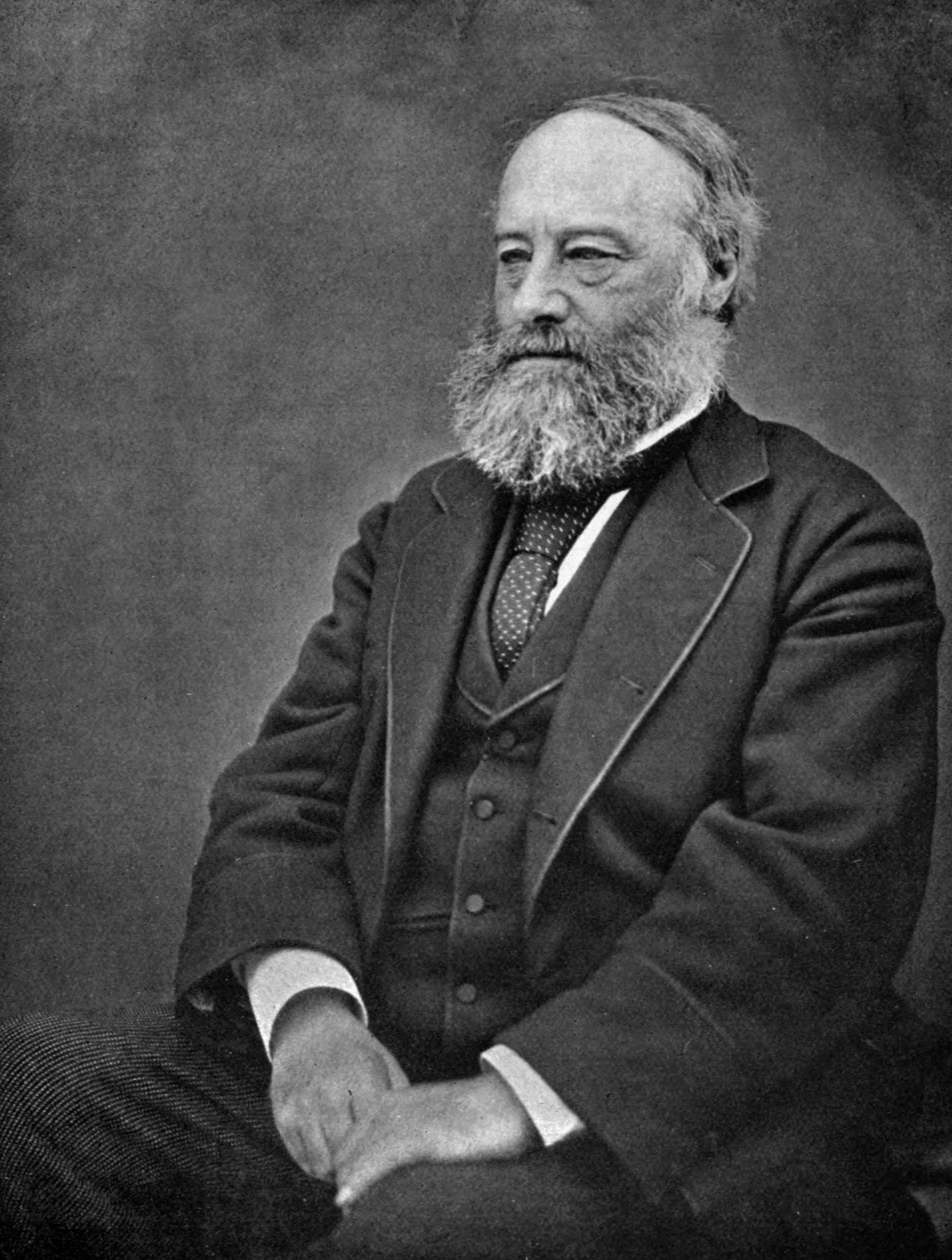
James Prescott Joule

- July 1 – Ignaz Semmelweis, Hungarian physician, obstetrician (d. 1865)
- July 18 – Louis Gerhard De Geer, 1st Prime Minister of Sweden (d. 1896)
- July 20 – Ernst Guhl, German art historian (d. 1862)
- July 22 – J. Gregory Smith, Vermont governor (d. 1891)
- July 27 – Agostino Roscelli, Italian priest, founder of the Institute of Sisters of the Immaculata (d. 1902)
- July 30
  - Emily Brontë, British novelist (d. 1848)
  - Jan Heemskerk, 2-time prime minister of the Netherlands (d. 1897)
- August 11 – Méry von Bruiningk, Estonian democrat (d. 1853)
- August 25 – Shiv Dayal Singh, Founder and first SatGuru of RadhaSoami Faith (d. 1878)
- September 1 – José María Castro Madriz, first President of Costa Rica, founder of the republic (d. 1892)
- September 12 – Richard Jordan Gatling, American inventor, gunsmith (d. 1903)
- September 27
  - Cosme García Sáez, Spanish inventor (d. 1874)
  - Adolph Wilhelm Hermann Kolbe, German chemist (d. 1884)
- October 8 – John Henninger Reagan, American Confederate politician (d. 1905)
- October 12 – Maximilian Cercha, Polish painter and drawer (d. 1907)
- October 15 – Irvin McDowell, American general (d. 1885)
- October 18 – Francis Dutton, Germany-born Premier of South Australia (d. 1877)
- November 5 – Benjamin Franklin Butler, American lawyer, politician, and general (d. 1893)
- November 9 (October 28 (O.S.)) – Ivan Turgenev, Russian writer (d. 1883)
- November 23 – József Szlávy, 6th Prime Minister of Hungary (d. 1900)
- November 29 – George Brown, Canadian politician (d. 1880)
- December 13 – Mary Todd Lincoln, First Lady of the United States (d. 1882)
- December 18 – Max Joseph von Pettenkofer, German chemist and hygienist (d. 1901)
- December 24 – James Prescott Joule, English physicist (d. 1889)
- December 27 – J. Lawrence Smith, American chemist (d. 1883)

=== Date unknown ===
- Dimitrie Brătianu, 15th Prime Minister of Romania (d. 1892)

== Deaths ==
=== January–June ===
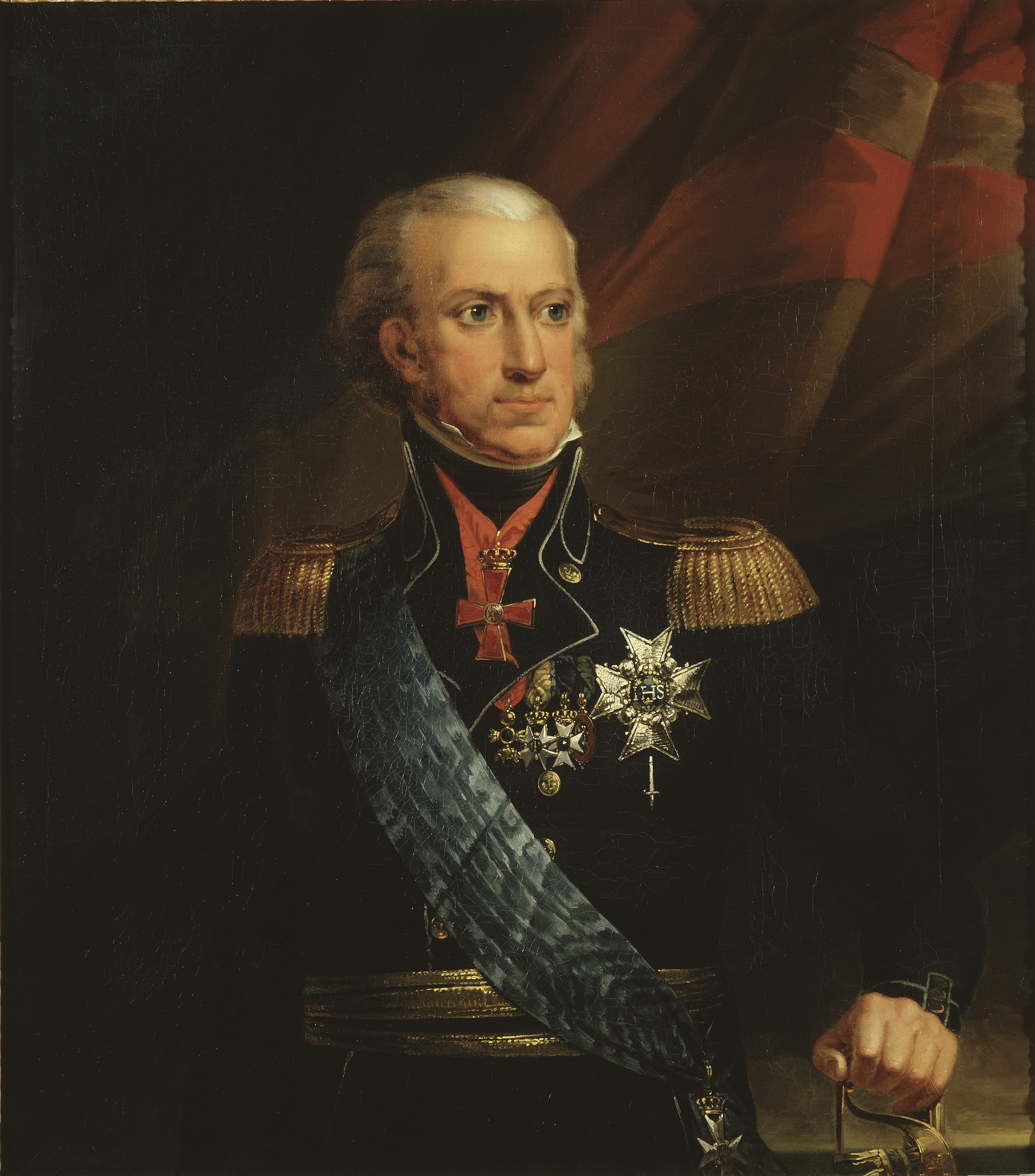
Charles XIII

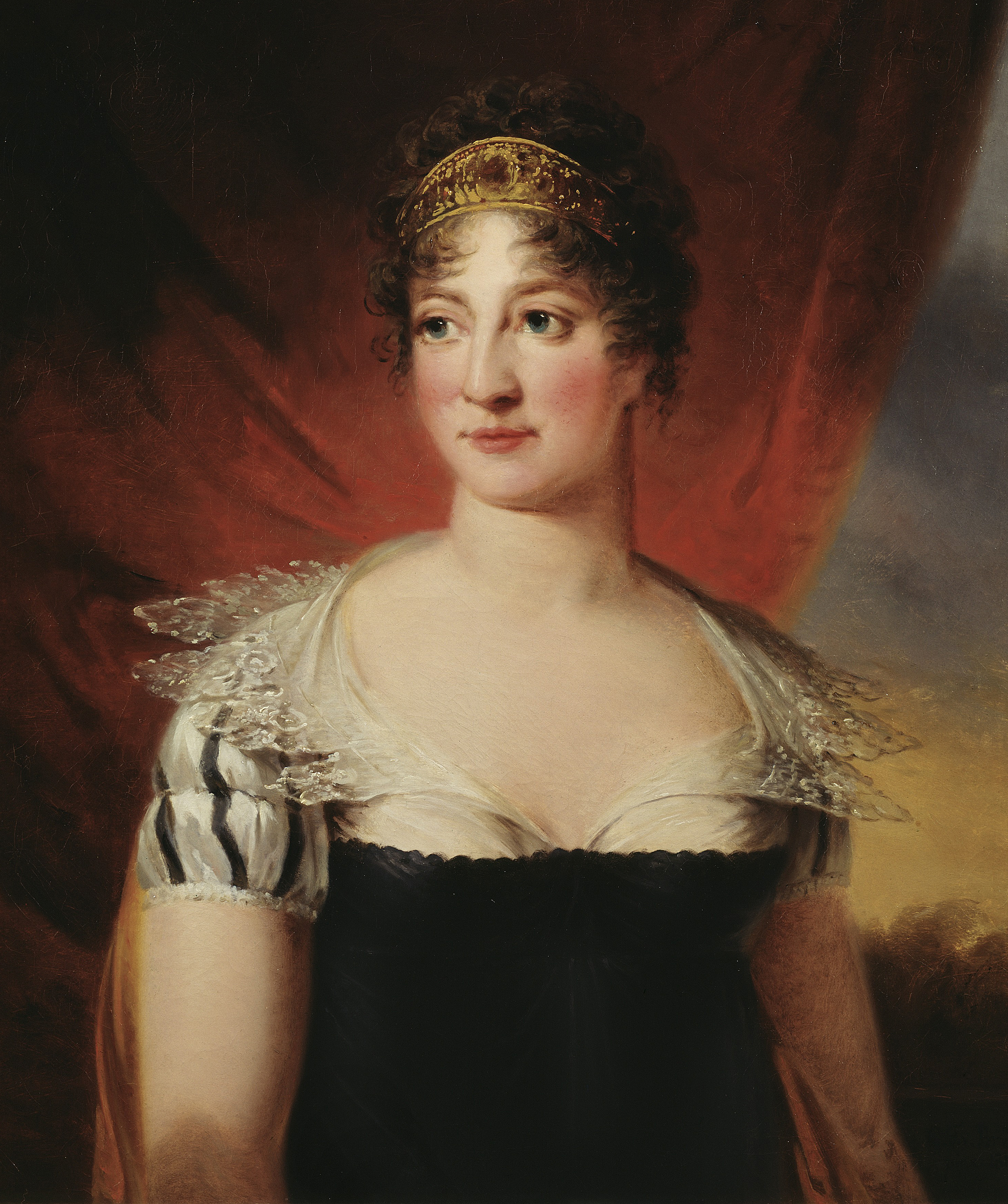
Hedvig Elisabeth Charlotte of Holstein-Gottorp

- January 2 – Martha Christina Tiahahu, Moluccan freedom fighter, national heroine of Indonesia (b. 1800)
- January 11 – Johann David Wyss, Swiss author (b. 1743)
- February 5 – Charles XIII/Charles II, King of Sweden and Norway (b. 1748)
- February 13 – George Rogers Clark, American Revolutionary leader (b. 1752)
- February 15 – Friedrich Ludwig, Fürst zu Hohenlohe-Ingelfingen, Prussian general (b. 1746)
- February 21 – David Humphreys, American diplomat (b. 1752)
- March 24 – Humphry Repton, English garden designer (b. 1752)
- April 16 – Nikolaus von Krufft, Austrian composer and civil servant (b. 1779)
- May 2 – Herman Willem Daendels, Governor-General of the Dutch East Indies (b. 1762)
- May 10 – Paul Revere, American patriot, silversmith (b. 1735)
- May 13 – Louis Joseph, Prince of Condé (b. 1736)
- May 18 – Maddalena Laura Sirmen, Italian musician and composer (b. 1745)
- May 26 – Michael Andreas Barclay de Tolly, Russian military commander (b. 1761)
- June 12 – Egwale Seyon, Emperor of Ethiopia
- June 20 – Hedvig Elisabeth Charlotte of Holstein-Gottorp, queen consort of Sweden and Norway (b. 1759)
- June 24 – Alexander Kurakin, Russian diplomat (b. 1752)

=== July–December ===
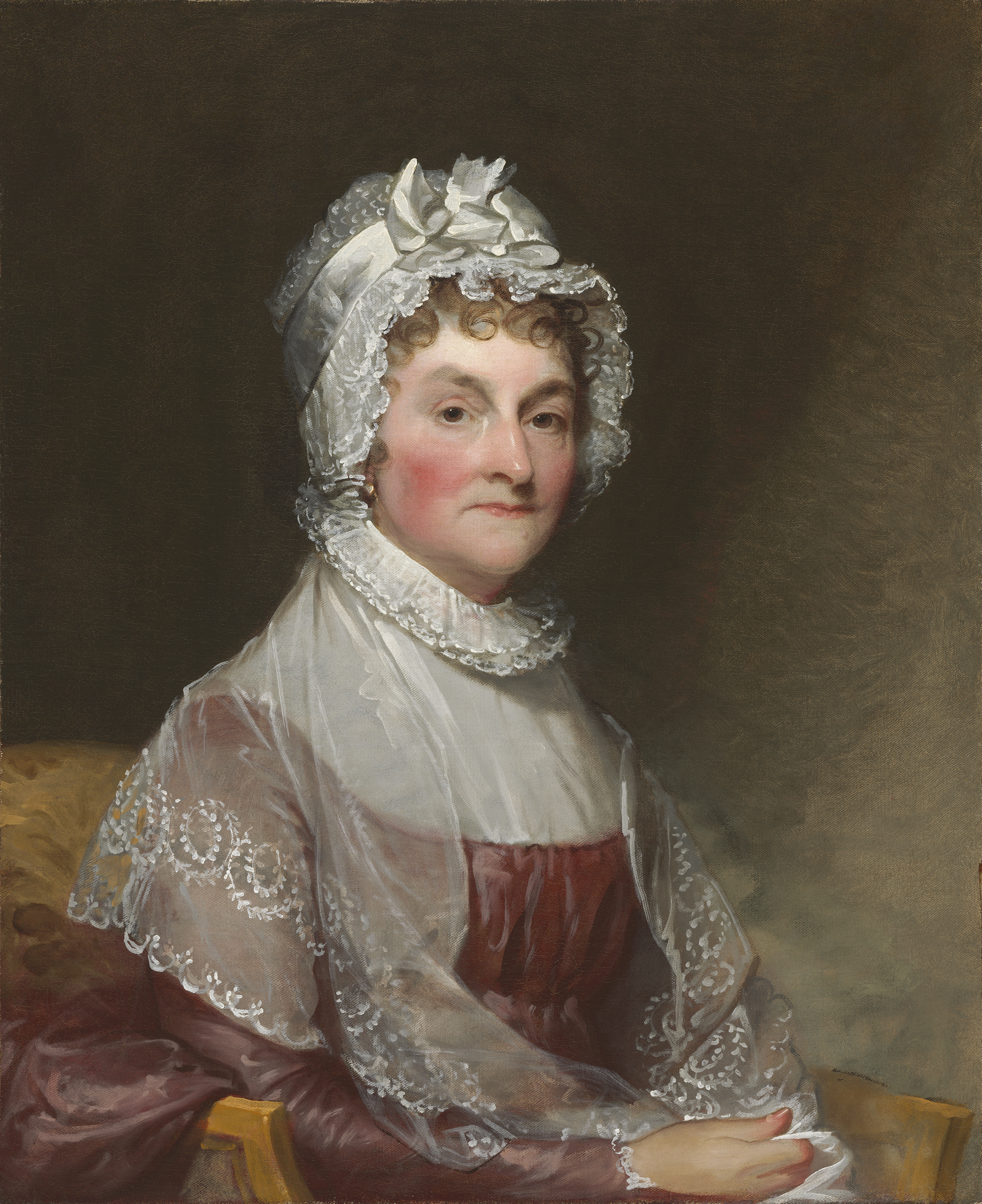
Abigail Adams

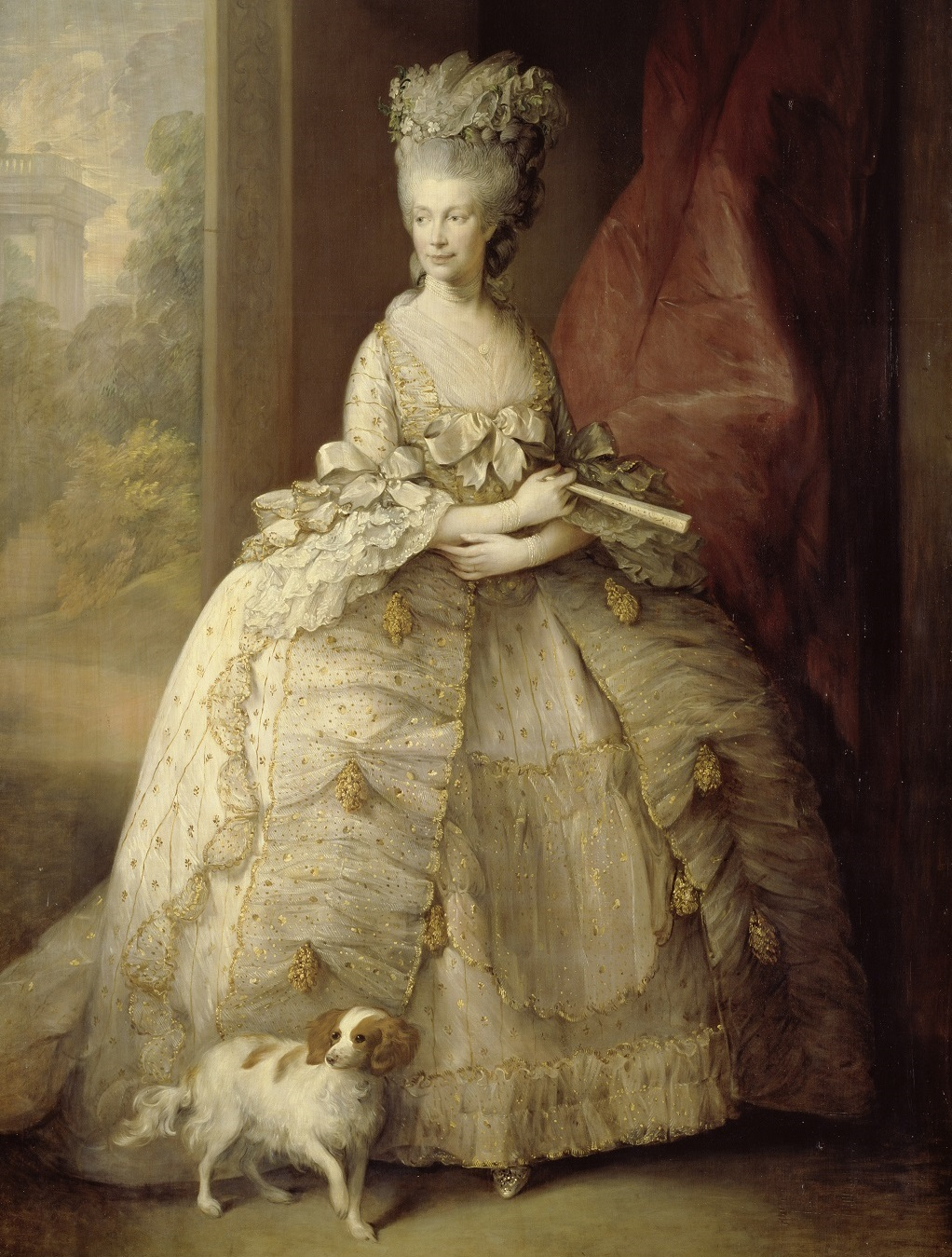
Charlotte of Mecklenburg-Strelitz

- July 28 – Gaspard Monge, French mathematician and geometer (b. 1746)
- August 4 – Tom Molineaux, African-American boxer (b. 1784)
- August 5 – Sir John Barrington, 9th Baronet of Great Britain (b. 1752)
- August 11 – Robert Carr Brackenbury, English Methodist preacher (b. 1752)
- August 12 – Nikolay Novikov, Russian writer (b. 1744)
- August 22 – Warren Hastings, English Governor-General of India (b. 1732)
- August 31 – Arthur St. Clair, American soldier, politician (b. 1737)
- September 1 – Robert Calder, British naval officer (b. 1745)
- September 9 – Seymour Fleming, British noblewoman (b. 1758)
- October 28 – Abigail Adams, First Lady of the United States (b. 1744)
- October 28 – Henri Jacques Guillaume Clarke, duc de Feltre, French marshal, politician (b. 1765)
- November 17 – Charlotte of Mecklenburg-Strelitz, queen of George III of the United Kingdom (b. 1744)
- December 25 – Catherine-Dominique de Pérignon, Marshal of France (b. 1754)

=== Date unknown ===
- Ghaliyya Al Bogammiah, Saudi Arabian war heroine
