= Marie André Cantillon =

French soldier, attempted assassin

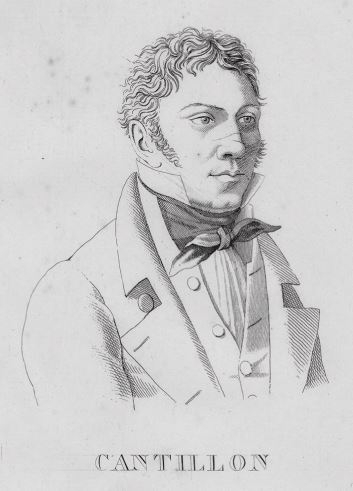
Cantillon drawn c. 1818

Marie André Nicolas Cantillon (1781/82 – July 1869) was a French soldier in the army of Napoleon. After the defeat of France in the Napoleonic Wars he attempted to assassinate the Duke of Wellington on 11 February 1818. Wellington was in Paris as commander of the allied occupation of France. Cantillon missed his shot and escaped, but was captured by the Parisian police shortly afterwards. Brought to trial in May 1819, he was acquitted after his pistol ball could not be found at the scene and his lawyer told the jury that a conviction would be a stain upon the honour of the nation. Cantillon was granted a bequest in the will of Napoleon I, though he only received part of the 10,000 francs. In his later life, he ran a grocery in Brussels, Belgium. His wife petitioned for the remainder of the bequest and may have received it from a commission established by Napoleon III.

== Early life ==
Cantillon was a distant relative of the French-Irish economist Richard Cantillon (d. 1734) and descended from the same Ballyheigue, County Kerry, branch of the family. Cantillon was born in Paris, to a model maker, in 1781/82 and worked in the jewellery trade. He was conscripted into the cavalry of the French Army and rose to become a non-commissioned officer and then sous-lieutenant (sub-lieutenant) in the hussars. He served in the 1st Hussars during the War of the Fifth Coalition and an 1858 account by William Stirling Maxwell has him attempting to kill the regiment's colonel for a perceived affront, after which he was pardoned by Napoleon for his bravery in battle. The same account states Cantillon afterwards joined the Chasseurs à Cheval de la Garde Impériale, retiring on a pension in 1813 before re-joining Napoleon for the Hundred Days. After the peace of 1815 he is said to have split his time between Brussels and Paris, with trips to Coblenz and Cologne. Cantillon is said to have been known for his fierce Bonapartism and hatred of the English.

== Assassination attempt ==
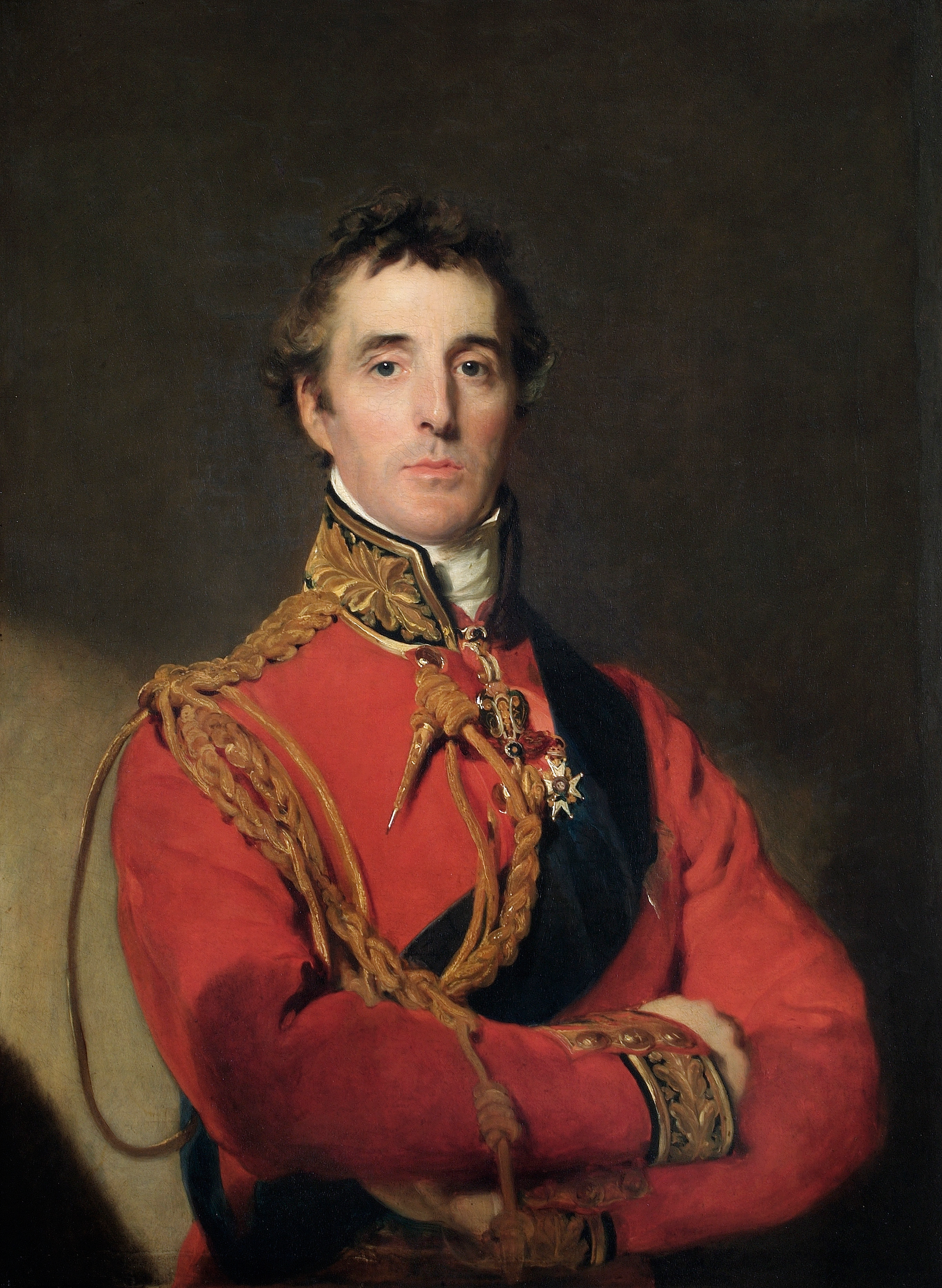
Portrait of the Duke of Wellington by Thomas Lawrence, c.1816

At around 12:30 am on the morning of 11 February 1818 Cantillon attempted to assassinate the Duke of Wellington, the British commander of the allied occupation of France. At the time Wellington was staying in a hotel on the Champs-Élysées in Paris. The assassination attempt began as Wellington was returning by carriage from dinner with the British Ambassador to France, Sir Charles Stuart. Cantillon ran across the road in front of the carriage, which raised the suspicions of Wellington's coachman who increased speed. As the coach turned to enter the gate of the hotel Cantillon fired one shot from a pistol. The shot missed and Wellington was not alarmed as he thought the shot was an unintentional discharge from a sentry.

Cantillon was chased by a guard but escaped from the scene. Cantillon had raised the suspicions of the Parisian police when he arrived in the city from Brussels a few days before and he was arrested shortly after the assassination attempt, in company with an accomplice named Marinet. Stirling Maxwell's 1858 account states that Cantillon shaved off his beard and moustache to avoid recognition while attempting to reach Belgium, but was captured on 15 March.

The French police declined to investigate alleged connections between Cantillon and a group in Brussels known to have advocated the assassination of Wellington and with supposed connections with the staff of William, Prince of Orange. Cantillon confessed to the police that he had attempted to assassinate Wellington, but a search could not locate the pistol ball which would have confirmed the shot was fired and there was no evidence linking him to the scene. Cantillon and Marinet were held in prison for a lengthy period without trial and in November Cantillon's lawyer formally complained about this. Witnesses, including the Duke of Wellington, were summoned on 12 March 1819 to attend the Seine department's cour d'assises on 5 May. The start was later delayed to 10 May.

At Cantillon's trial his lawyer admitted his client had attempted to assassinate Wellington but appealed to the jury to find him not guilty as to do otherwise would dishonour France. Cantillon and Marinet were acquitted. The only punishment Cantillon received was demotion to the rank of sergeant. Wellington received the congratulations of most of the French royal family and the British Prince Regent on his escape. Among the few French royals to not send a message was Louis Philippe, Duke of Orléans, who would take the French throne in the 1830 July Revolution and reign until the Revolution of 1848. As King of France, Louis Philippe appointed Cantillon as a gamekeeper at the Palace of Fontainebleau. In later life Cantillon became a grocer in Brussels; he died in July 1869.

== Napoleon's bequest ==
Extract from the will of Napoleon

Item 10,000f. to the sub-officer Cantillon, who has undergone a prosecution as accused of having assassinated Lord Wellington, of which he has been declared innocent. Cantillon had as much right to assassinate this oligarch as he had to send me to perish on the rock of St. Helena. Wellington, who proposed this outrage, sought to justify it by the interest of Great Britain. Cantillon, if he had actually assassinated this Lord, would have sheltered himself, and would have been justified by the same motives—the interest of France in ridding herself of a general who had, moreover, violated the capitulation of Paris, and thereby become responsible for the blood of the martyrs, Ney, Labédoyère, &c, and for the crime of having plundered the museums, contrary to the text of treaties

The French former emperor Napoleon I left Cantillon 10,000 francs (around £500 at the time and equivalent to £53,840 in 2023) in a codicil added to his will on 24 April 1821, just 11 days before Napoleon's death. In the codicil Napoleon justified the assassination attempt as revenge on Wellington for exiling him to St Helena, for the executions of his former generals Michel Ney and Charles de la Bédoyère and for the removal of artifacts from French museums (many of which had been looted by France from occupied territories). The exile was less harsh than the punishment of execution that the French Bourbons and Prussians had pressed for after Napoleon's 1815 defeat. This codicil of Napoleon's will caused outrage when it became known in England, where it was common knowledge that Wellington had expressly forbidden his men from targeting Napoleon on the field of Waterloo. Wellington considered that the bequest was the "greatest blot" on Napoleon's character.

Napoleon's final will took little account of his financial status at the time, his wealth being much reduced by his abdication. Napoleon made bequests totalling some 200,000,000 francs, but had assets worth only 8,000,000; many beneficiaries received much less than he had directed. Cantillon received part of the bequest between 1823 and 1826. He did not pursue payment of the remainder, though his wife did, in August 1854, Napoleon III having since come to power as emperor after the 1851 French coup d'état. Mrs. Cantillon claimed for 1,200 francs she stated were outstanding from the bequest. Napoleon III established a commission to decide outstanding claims against Napoleon I's estate. In April 1855, the commission found that Napoleon I was not of sound mind when he wrote the codicil that favoured Cantillon, as by the time of writing he was in the last stages of terminal stomach cancer. It is possible that the decision of the commission was swayed by political concerns, as it was made while Britain and France were allies, fighting Russia in the Crimean War.

However, a report in the Moniteur of 6 May 1855 notes that Cantillon, listed 32nd on a list of beneficiaries, received payment in full from Napoleon I's estate, plus 354 francs of interest. This was despite an earlier report in the newspaper that the only beneficiaries to be paid in full were a number of the former emperor's servants. It was said at the time, though denied by the French government, that Napoleon III intervened and directed that Cantillon be paid. The reported payment was the subject of a 12 February 1858 question from the Scottish member of parliament William Stirling-Maxwell to the prime minister Henry John Temple, 3rd Viscount Palmerston. Palmerston stated that he thought it was in poor taste for Stirling-Maxwell to imply that Napoleon III had anything to do with a payment being made and noted that a portion of the bequest had been paid in the 1820s, when the Bourbon monarchy was in power.

== Bibliography ==
- Stirling-Maxwell, William (1858). Napoleon's Bequest to Cantillon: A Fragment of International History. John W. Parker.
- Gleig, George Robert (1862). The Life of Arthur, First Duke of Wellington. Longman, Green, Longman, and Roberts.
- Roberts, Andrew (2001). Napoleon and Wellington: The Battle of Waterloo- and the Great Commanders who Fought it. Simon and Schuster. ISBN 978-0-7432-2832-9.
