= William Atherton (minister) =

English Wesleyan minister

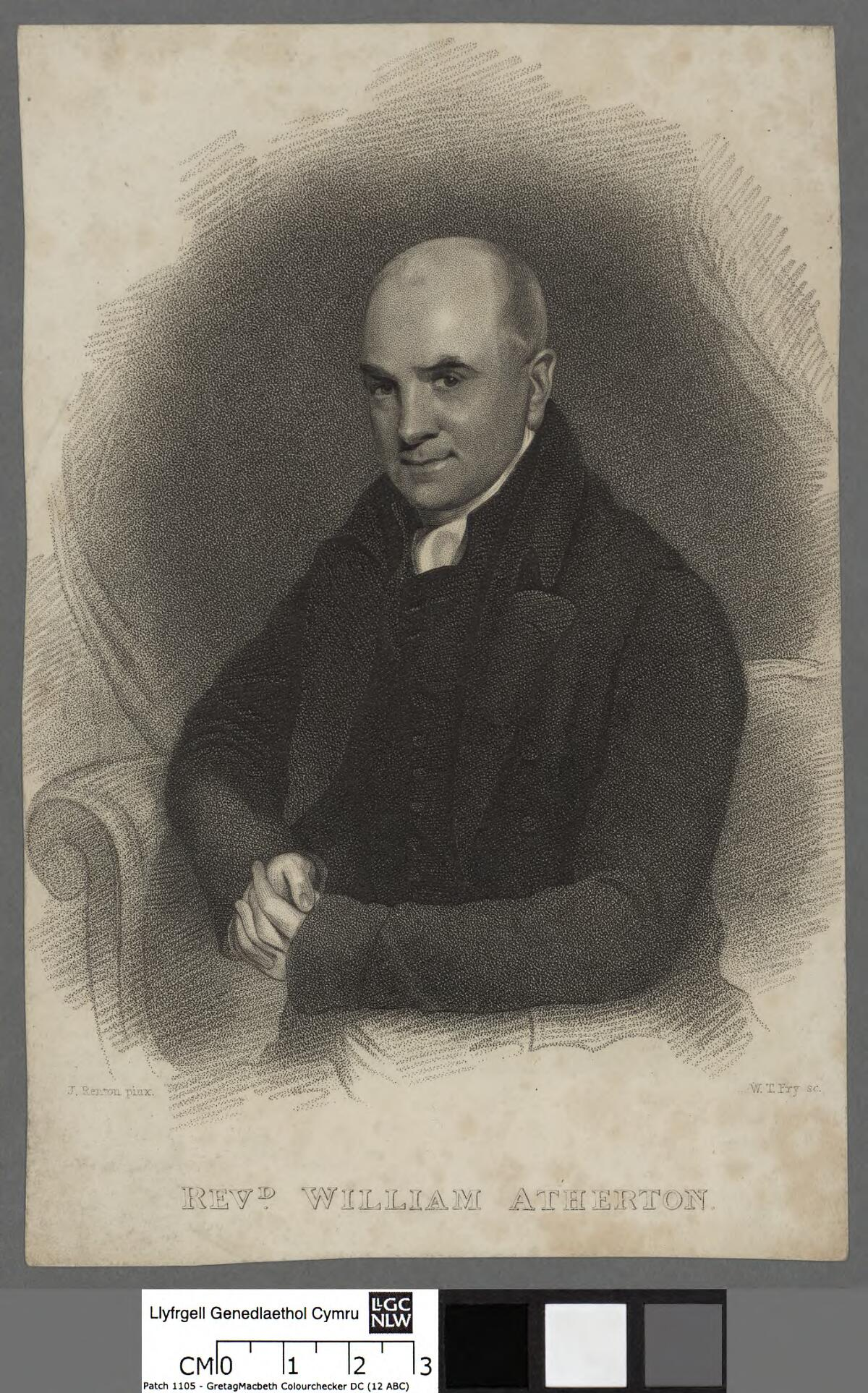
- Portrait of Rev. William Atherton by William Thomas Fry

President of the Methodist Conference
- In office 1846–1847
- Preceded by: Jacob Stanley
- Succeeded by: Samuel Jackson

Personal details
- Born: 1775 Lamberhead Green
- Died: 1850 (aged 74–75)
- Occupation: Wesleyan minister
- Known for: Insecurity of Life

William Atherton (1775–1850) was a Wesleyan minister and an early Methodist local preacher.

== Early years ==
Atherton was born at Lamberhead Green, near Wigan in Lancashire, in 1775.

== Career ==
In 1796, at the age of 21, Atherton entered the Wesleyan ministry on the Grimsby & Cleethorpes Methodist circuit. He followed the teachings of John Wesley, George Whitefield and Charles Wesley, who were the founders of the movement. Atherton's fresh and original style of preaching gave him a place among the most famous preachers of England in the first half of the century.

Following the upsurge in interest in education which accompanied the extension of franchise in 1832, the Methodist Conference commissioned Atherton, together with Richard Treffry and Samuel Jackson to report on Methodist schools, coming to the conclusion that if the Church were to prosper, the system of Sunday schools (3,339 in number at that time, with 59,277 teachers and 341,442 pupils) should be augmented by day-schools with teachers educated to high school level.

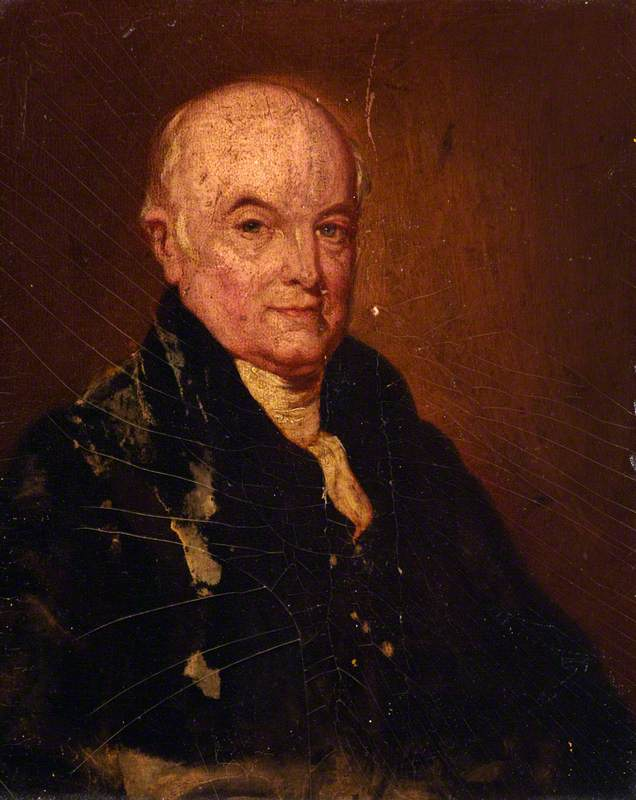
Portrait of Reverend William Atherton by unknown artist

Atherton is recorded as being a preacher from Bath, Somerset in 1835. In 1841 he was residing in the Parish of St Mary, Newington which at the time was part of Surrey and is now part of London.

After working under the direction of the Wesleyan Conference for more than fifty years, Atherton was chosen as the president of that assembly during 1846. He held differing views to Jabez Bunting.

After spending some years in London, Atherton became in 1849 superintendent of the Wakefield circuit and chairman of the Leeds district, a position which he held until his death on 26 September 1850, in his 74th year.

The John Rylands Library held a copy of one of Atherton's sermons. It now forms part of the Methodist Archives Collection of the University of Manchester Library, as well as the University of Texas, which has correspondence between the writer, James Everett and Atherton between 1812 and 1813 as well as a biography. Duke University also have records as part of their Frank Baker collection.

As of April 2021, his portrait held by the Museum of Methodism is in need of restoration.

== Author ==
Atherton published several works, among which were a sermon on the 'Insecurity of Life,' in 1818; an abridged 'Life of Lady Maxwell' in 1838; and an 'Address on the Character, Agencies, and Religious Effectiveness of Wesleyan Methodism,' in 1839.

The Life of Lady Maxwell related to Darcy Maxwell, who became Lady Maxwell of Pollok (1743 – 1810). Lady Maxwell was a British follower of Methodism and a philanthropist.

== Personal ==
He married Margaret, the daughter of Rev. Walter Morison, a minister of the Church of Scotland in 1803. His son was the Scottish politician Sir William Atherton. Atherton died on 26 September 1850 in Wakefield, Yorkshire.

He was painted by William Gush. An engraving is held by the Bibliothèque nationale de France.
