= Haggs Castle =

Tower house in Glasgow, Scotland

Coordinates: 55.8364°N 4.2959°W

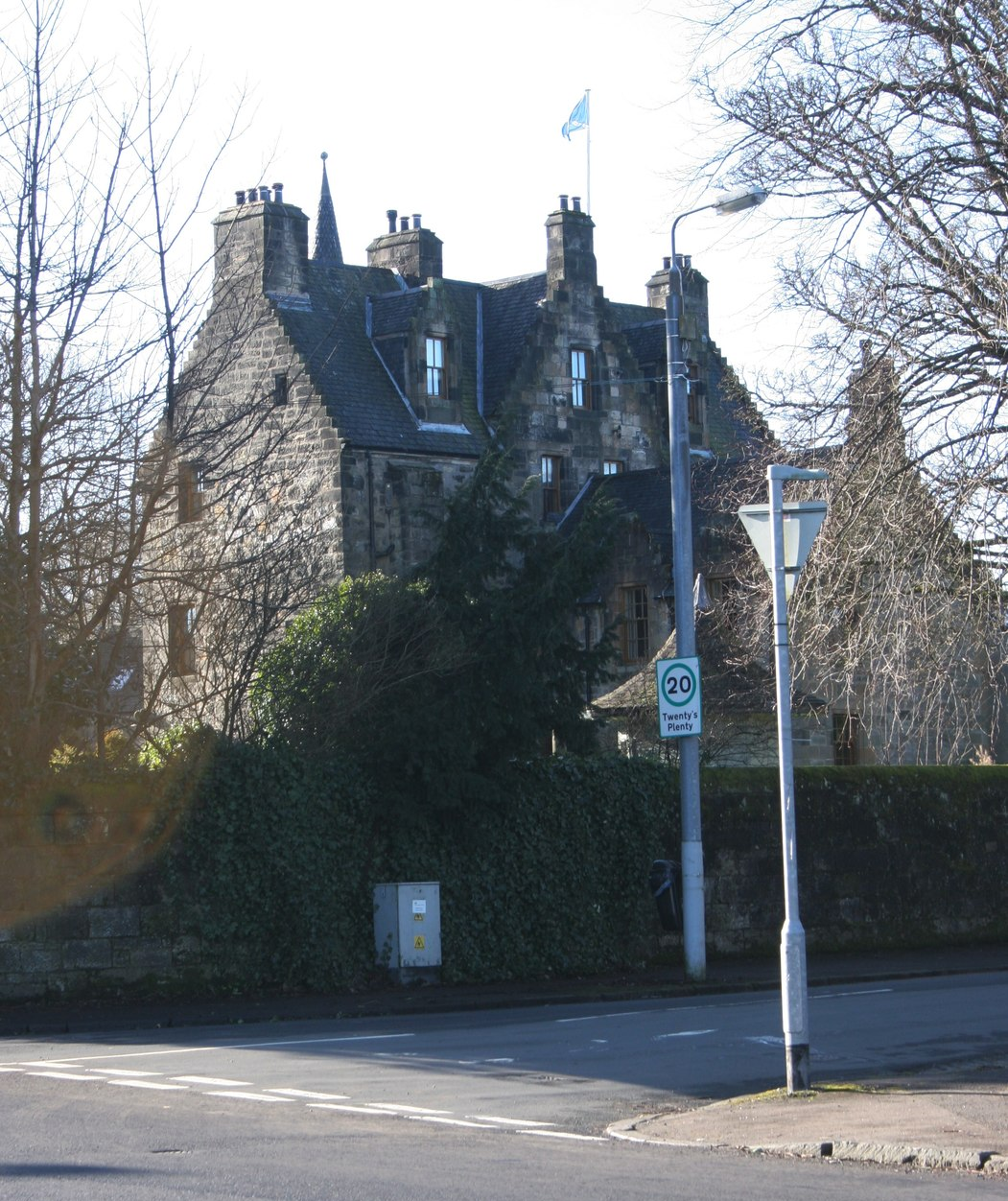
Haggs Castle

Haggs Castle is a 16th-century tower house, located in the neighbourhood of Pollokshields, in Glasgow, Scotland. The richly decorated building was restored in the 19th century, and today is once more occupied as a residence.

== History ==
The carved stone above the door records that Haggs was built in 1585 by Sir John Maxwell of Pollok and his wife Margaret Conyngham (Cunningham). It was built to replace the Maxwells' former residence, the Laigh Castle, a 14th-century building which stood to the west. Although built as the Maxwells' main residence, it was later used as a jointure house, or dower house, being occupied by the lord's widow. The Maxwells, a covenanting family, were fined for nonconformist activities, although the change of government resulting from the revolution of 1688 saved them from paying up. In 1753 Haggs in turn was replaced as a residence and abandoned when Pollok House was completed.

The castle basement was later used as a smithy. In the 1850s the remains were consolidated, and in the 1860s the castle was restored for the Maxwells' factor. Further restorations and additions were undertaken by Sir John Stirling-Maxwell in 1899–1900. A renovation scheme was prepared by architects MacGibbon and Ross, although their plans for a faithful restoration were not followed.

In 1943 the castle was requisitioned by the military, and was later divided into flats. In 1972 the Glasgow Corporation bought the castle, converting it to serve as the Museum of Childhood. When this closed in 1998, the house once more became a private dwelling.

== Architecture ==
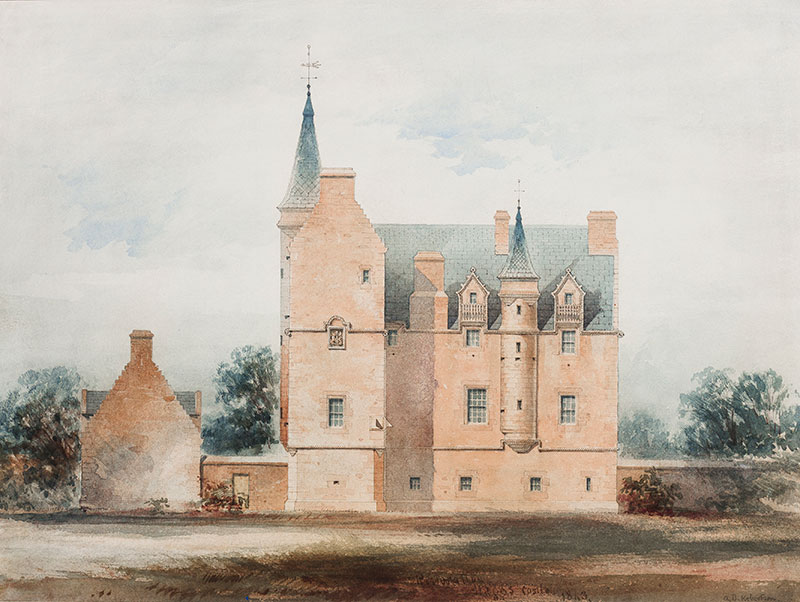
Haggs Castle (1843) by Alexander Duff Robertson, in ink and watercolour

Haggs Castle is an altered L-plan tower, of 4 storeys. The main block measures around 17 m by 7.2 m. The ground floor contained two chambers and a kitchen with a large fireplace. The main stair led up to the first floor, where a private room was located behind the main hall. Smaller corbelled stairs led to the upper storeys, which included a square cap house above the stair tower. Square and round gun loops were located around the tower. The most striking feature is the carved decoration, including cable-moulded string courses, moulded corbels, and the carving over the door.

In the 19th century, the upper parts of the walls were rebuilt with larger dormer windows. Other windows were also enlarged, and the stair wing was rebuilt. Most obviously, a new entrance and stair were added to the south, and a new wing to the north.
