= William Lockhart (MP) =

British politician

Member of Parliament for Lanarkshire
- In office 7 July 1841 – 25 November 1856
- Preceded by: Alexander Macdonald Lockhart
- Succeeded by: Alexander Baillie-Cochrane

Personal details
- Born: 1787
- Died: 25 November 1856 (aged 69) Milton Lockhart
- Resting place: Carluke
- Party: Conservative
- Spouse: Mary Jane Palliser
- Parent(s): Dr John Lockhart, Elizabeth Lockhart

William Lockhart (1787 – 25 November 1856) was a British Conservative politician.

William Lockhart was born in 1787 the eldest son of Rev. Dr John Lockhart of the parish of Blackfriars Glasgow and his first wife Elizabeth Dinwoodie.

Lockhart was elected Conservative MP for Lanarkshire at the 1841 general election and held the seat until his death in 1856. It was recognized that although he was no great orator the ‘House of Commons did not possess a better man of business, nor one who studied more attentively the interests of his constituents'.

Alongside his role as MP, Lockhart was Dean of Faculties at Glasgow University from 1851 to 1853.

He was a Deputy-Lieutenant of Lanarkshire and Colonel Commandant of the Lanarkshire Yeomanry Cavalry.

== Personal life ==
He married on 16 April 1822 at Walcott Bath, Somerset, Mary Jane Palliser (1801–1881), the youngest daughter of Sir Hugh Palliser Bart (1768–1813) and his wife Mary (1758–1723). William and Mary divorced in the Scottish Courts on 12 May 1835 on the grounds of William Lockhart's adultery.

William Lockhart died on 25 November 1856 at Milton Lockhart of Febrile Disease while still a sitting MP. He was buried in Carluke churchyard on 2 December 1856. An inscription reads: 'Here buried William Lockhart MP for Lanarkshire 4th in descent from above Robert Lockhart of Birkhill and wife Jean Bruce of Clackmannan and eldest son of John Lockhart DD by Elizabeth Dunwiddie of Germiston unopposed he served his native country in Parliament from 1842 to his death, he was also a Deputy Lieutenant of the county and the Dean of Faculties of Glasgow university.'

Lockhart was the elder half-brother of writer and editor John Gibson Lockhart.

Parliament of the United Kingdom
Preceded by Alexander Macdonald Lockhart	Member of Parliament for Lanarkshire; 1841–1856	Succeeded by Alexander Baillie-Cochrane
