= Darcy Maxwell =

British follower of Methodism and philanthropist (1743-1810)

- Born: Darcy Brisbane; 1743; Largs
- Died: 2 July 1810 (aged 66–67); Edinburgh
- Occupation: Philanthropist
- Spouse: Sir Walter Maxwell
- Children: Sir John Maxwell

Darcy Maxwell, born Darcy Brisbane; became Lady Maxwell of Pollok (1743 – 2 July 1810) was a British follower of Methodism and a philanthropist. She started a poor school in Edinburgh and several Sunday Schools and she left a large diary.

== Life ==
Maxwell was born in Brisbane in Largs in Scotland. Her father was Thomas Brisbane and when she was a teenager she married Sir Walter Maxwell of the Maxwell Macdonald baronets on 19 February 1760 in Edinburgh. An annuity of £300 a year was given to her in exchange for the transfer of ownership of her estate to her husband. By the time she was nineteen she was a mother and a widow as Walter died on 29 April 1762 and only weeks later their baby son, Sir John, died. Her husband's title went to her brother-in-law (now) Sir James Maxwell. She took this disaster as a signal from God and despite proposals of remarriage she decided to devote her life to religious causes.

In 1764 she started to attend Methodist meetings and she met the movement's founder John Wesley. She also continued to attend Church of Scotland services where she could take Holy Communion.

In 1770 she not only paid for the creation of a school in Edinburgh for children too poor to pay for education, but she managed the school as well. She saw to the schools accounts and supervised the school's operation.

Robert Raikes, who published a newspaper in Gloucester, had funded and publicised several Sunday Schools which he had organised with Thomas Stock. He and Raikes paid four women to teach children on Sundays in their homes in about 1780. The idea spread quickly and John Wesley was keen on the idea. The children would learn to read and also learn the catechism. Maxwell established several Sunday Schools. Two were in Edinburgh and one was in London.

== Death and legacy ==
Maxwell died in Edinburgh in 1810. After her death two biographies were published; one by the Reverend John Lancaster in 1821. He was able to draw upon her "voluminous diary" and her letters. The other biography was by William Atherton and was published in 1838.
