= Glasgow College (UK Parliament constituency) =

Parliamentary constituency in the United Kingdom, 1885–1918

- Former burgh constituency for the House of Commons
- Major settlements: Glasgow

1885–1918
- Seats: One
- Created from: Glasgow
- Replaced by: Glasgow Kelvingrove

Glasgow College was a parliamentary constituency in Glasgow. It returned one Member of Parliament (MP) to the House of Commons of the Parliament of the United Kingdom, elected by the plurality voting system.

== History ==
The constituency was created by the Redistribution of Seats Act 1885 for the 1885 general election, and abolished for the 1918 general election.

== Boundaries ==
The Redistribution of Seats Act 1885 provided that the constituency was to consist of the Tenth and Eleventh municipal wards.

== Members of Parliament ==
Election	Member	Party
1885	Charles Cameron	Liberal
1895	Sir John Stirling-Maxwell	Conservative
1906	Harry Watt	Liberal
1918	constituency abolished	

== Elections ==
=== Elections in the 1880s ===
General election 1885: Glasgow College
Party	Candidate	Votes	%	±%
Liberal	Charles Cameron	5,662	57.8	
Conservative	William Montgomery-Cuninghame	4,139	42.2	
Majority		1,523	15.6	
Turnout		9,801	82.1	
Registered electors		11,934		
Liberal win (new seat)				

General election 1886: Glasgow College
Party	Candidate	Votes	%	±%
Liberal	Charles Cameron	4,880	53.6	−4.2
Liberal Unionist	Richard Vary Campbell	4,225	46.4	+4.2
Majority		655	7.2	−8.4
Turnout		9,105	76.3	−5.8
Registered electors		11,934		
Liberal hold		Swing	−4.2	

=== Elections in the 1890s ===
General election 1892: Glasgow College
Party	Candidate	Votes	%	±%
Liberal	Charles Cameron	5,804	53.8	+0.2
Conservative	John Stirling-Maxwell	4,758	44.1	−2.3
Scottish Trades Councils	Robert Brodie	225	2.1	New
Majority		1,046	9.7	+2.5
Turnout		10,787	78.1	+1.8
Registered electors		13,809		
Liberal hold		Swing	+1.3	

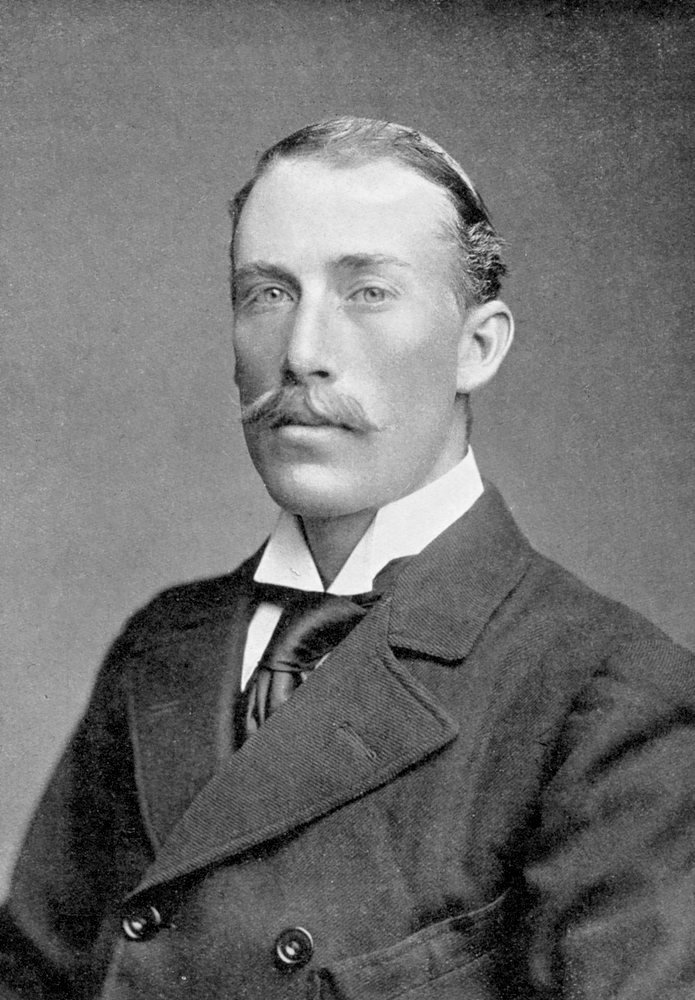
Stirling-Maxwell

General election 1895: Glasgow College
Party	Candidate	Votes	%	±%
Conservative	John Stirling-Maxwell	5,364	56.0	+11.9
Liberal	Charles Cameron	4,219	44.0	−9.8
Majority		1,145	12.0	N/A
Turnout		9,583	64.0	−14.1
Registered electors		14,967		
Conservative gain from Liberal		Swing	+10.9	

=== Elections in the 1900s ===
General election 1900: Glasgow College
Party	Candidate	Votes	%	±%
Conservative	John Stirling-Maxwell	6,629	56.2	+0.2
Liberal	Robert Paterson	5,160	43.8	−0.2
Majority		1,469	12.4	+0.4
Turnout		11,789	73.8	+9.8
Registered electors		15,975		
Conservative hold		Swing	+0.2	

Watt

General election 1906: Glasgow College
Party	Candidate	Votes	%	±%
Liberal	Harry Watt	7,359	56.5	+12.7
Conservative	John Stirling-Maxwell	5,676	43.5	−12.7
Majority		1,683	13.0	N/A
Turnout		13,035	82.8	+9.0
Registered electors		15,741		
Liberal gain from Conservative		Swing	+12.7	

=== Elections in the 1910s ===
General election January 1910: Glasgow College
Party	Candidate	Votes	%	±%
Liberal	Harry Watt	6,535	52.9	−3.6
Conservative	John Stirling-Maxwell	5,823	47.1	+3.6
Majority		712	5.8	−7.2
Turnout		12,358	85.8	+3.0
Registered electors		14,244		
Liberal hold		Swing	−3.6	

General election December 1910: Glasgow College
Party	Candidate	Votes	%	±%
Liberal	Harry Watt	6,291	51.5	−1.4
Conservative	Ralph Glyn	5,932	48.5	+1.4
Majority		359	3.0	−2.8
Turnout		12,223	85.8	0.0
Registered electors		14,244		
Liberal hold		Swing	−1.4	

General Election 1914–15:

Another General Election was required to take place before the end of 1915. The political parties had been making preparations for an election to take place and by July 1914, the following candidates had been selected;

- Liberal: Harry Watt
- Unionist:
