= Sir William Stirling-Maxwell, 9th Baronet =

19th-century Scottish writer and politician 1818-1878)

Sir William Stirling-Maxwell Bt KT FRSE DCL
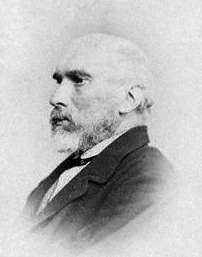
- Sir William Stirling-Maxwell, c. 1870, photograph by Thomas Annan

Member of Parliament for Perthshire
- In office 12 February 1874 – 15 January 1878
- Preceded by: Charles Stuart Parker
- Succeeded by: Henry Home-Drummond-Moray

Personal details
- Born: William Stirling; 8 March 1818 Kenmure, East Dunbartonshire, Scotland
- Died: 15 January 1878 (aged 59) Venice, Italy
- Party: Conservative
- Spouses: Lady Anna Maria Leslie-Melville (m. 1865; died 1874) Caroline Norton (m. 1877; died 1877)
- Children: 2
- Parent(s): Archibald Stirling; Elizabeth Maxwell
- Relatives: Edward Stirling (half-brother)
- Education: Trinity College, Cambridge
- Occupation: Historic writer, art historian, politician

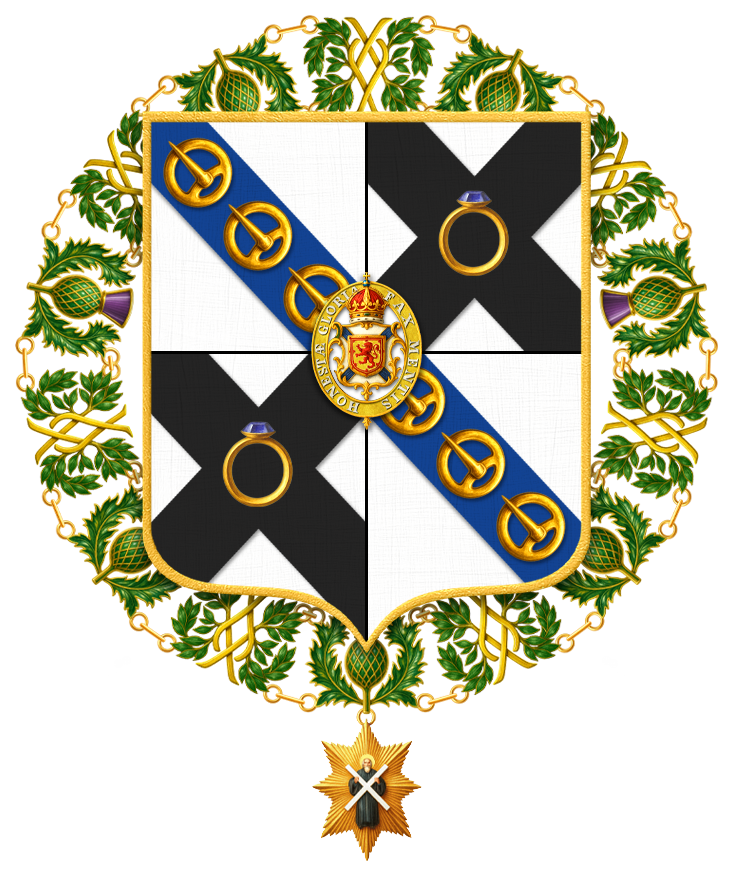
Shield of Arms of Sir William Stirling-Maxwell, 9th Baronet, KT, FRSE

Sir William Stirling-Maxwell, 9th Baronet, KT, FRSE (8 March 1818 – 15 January 1878) was a Scottish historical writer, art historian and politician.

Until 1865 he was known as William Stirling, and several of his books were published under that name. He was Chancellor of the University of Glasgow from 1875 until his death and was also a Knight of the Thistle, considered the highest honour that can be conferred by the Crown on a Scotsman.

== Life ==
Stirling was born at Kenmure, the son of Archibald Stirling, Esq., of Keir and Cawder, and Elizabeth Maxwell, sister of Sir John Maxwell, 8th Baronet, and Harriet Maxwell (died 1812) and daughter of Sir John Maxwell, 7th Baronet and Hannah or Anne Gardiner, daughter of Richard Gardiner, of Aldborough, Suffolk. Stirling's father owned a number of slave plantations in Jamaica and fathered at least six illegitimate children with women of colour, including Edward Stirling who became one of the first settlers in South Australia.

He was privately educated at Olney in Buckinghamshire then studied at Trinity College, Cambridge, graduating with a BA degree in 1839 and proceeding to MA in 1843. He travelled in Spain and the Levant and contributed to Fraser's Magazine and the Examiner. In 1848 he published his pioneering Annals of the Artists of Spain. He succeeded to the Keir estates in 1847.

In 1849 he was elected a Fellow of the Royal Society of Edinburgh his proposer being John Russell. He served as the Society's vice president from 1871 to 1875.

He served as Member of Parliament for Perthshire from 1852 to 1868 and again from 1874 to 1878. He was appointed a Member of the Universities Commission in 1859 and of the Historical Manuscripts Commission from its establishment in 1869 to 1878, as well as of the Scottish Education Board (a forerunner to the Scottish Office). He was elected Rector of the University of St Andrews in 1862 and of the University of Edinburgh in 1871. He was appointed Vice-Lieutenant of Perthshire in 1866, and a Deputy Lieutenant of Renfrew in 1870.

He succeeded to the Maxwell Baronetcy (in the Baronetage of Nova Scotia) in 1865, assuming the additional name of Maxwell.

He was elected Chancellor of the University of Glasgow in 1875, the first to have been elected by members of the General Council (previous Chancellors having been elected by members of the Senate), and was awarded an Honorary DCL from the University of Oxford in the following year. He was a member of the University of London Senate and a trustee of the British Museum and the National Gallery.

He lived at Keir House near Dunblane. He was a breeder of shorthorns and Clydesdale horses, an ardent bibliographer and collector of works of art.

He died on holiday in Venice on 15 January 1878 but his body was returned to Britain and he is buried in the Lecropt Churchyard near Stirling.

== Marriages and issue ==
He married firstly Lady Anna Maria Leslie-Melville (died 8 December 1874), daughter of David Leslie-Melville, 8th Earl of Leven and Elizabeth Anne Campbell, and had, at least:

- Sir John Stirling-Maxwell, 10th Baronet, of Pollok
- Brigadier General Archibald Stirling, of Keir (14 September 1867 – 18 February 1931), married on 14 April 1910 The Hon. Margaret Mary Fraser (25 June 1881 – 4 August 1972), daughter of Simon Fraser, 13th Lord Lovat and Alice Mary Weld-Blundell, and had six children:
  - William Joseph Stirling, of Keir (9 May 1911 – 1 January 1983), married on 22 November 1940 Susan Rachel Bligh (12 August 1916 – 1983), daughter of The Hon. Noel Gervase Bligh and Mary Frost and granddaughter of Ivo Bligh, 8th Earl of Darnley and Florence Rose Morphy, and had five children:
    - Archibald Hugh Stirling, of Keir (born 18 September 1941)
    - James Joseph Stirling (1943–1943)
    - Hannah Ann Stirling (born 29 May 1944), married on 7 January 1970 Robert Gascoyne-Cecil, 7th Marquess of Salisbury (born 30 September 1946)
    - Magdalen Stirling (born 25 November 1945), married in 1969 Patrick Petit, and had issue
    - John Alexander Stirling (born 26 February 1948), married first in 1971 Susan Black, without issue, and married secondly in 1985 Olivia Louise Waller, and had three children:
      - Joseph Patrick William Stirling (born 1985)
      - Christabel Georgia Stirling (born 1987)
      - Hugh David Archibald Stirling (born 1993)
  - Peter John Stirling (1 February 1913 – 15 April 1994), married on 6 February 1963 Mahin Feli
  - Colonel Sir Archibald David Stirling (15 November 1915 – 4 November 1990)
  - Hugh Joseph Stirling (4 May 1917 – k.i.a., World War II, Libya, 22 April 1941), unmarried and without issue
  - Margaret Elizabeth Mary Stirling (4 July 1914 – 9 February 1997), married on 26 June 1940 Simon Ramsay, 16th Earl of Dalhousie (17 October 1914 – 1999)
  - Irene Katharine Teresa Stirling (9 March 1919 – February 1992)

In March 1877, Stirling Maxwell married secondly noted author and society figure Caroline Norton, a granddaughter of the famous Irish playwright Richard Brinsley Sheridan. She died three months later.

== Selected publications ==
=== Anonymous ===
- Songs of the Holy Land (privately printed, 1846)
- An Essay towards a Collection of Books Relating to Proverbs, Emblems, Apophthegms, Epitaphs, and Ana (privately printed, 1860)
- Ut Pictura Poesis, or An Attempt to Explain in Verse The Emblemata Horatiana of Otho Vaenius (privately printed, 1875), contributed the Bibliography of van Veen

=== As William Stirling ===
- Annals of the Artists of Spain (1847)
- The Cloister Life of the Emperor Charles the Fifth (London: John W. Parker & Son, 1852)
- Velazquez and his Works (1855)
- Napoleon's Bequest to Cantillon: a Fragment of International History (1858)

=== As Sir William Stirling-Maxwell ===
- The Chief Victories of the Emperor Charles the Fifth (1870)
- Don John of Austria (two volumes, 1883)

== Sources ==
- http://www.geneall.net/U/per_page.php?id=335061

Scottish Parliament
Preceded by Henry Home-Drummond	Member of Parliament for Perthshire; 1852–1868	Succeeded by Charles Stuart Parker
Preceded by Charles Stuart Parker	Member of Parliament for Perthshire; 1874–1878	Succeeded by Henry Home-Drummond-Moray
Academic offices
Preceded by The Lord Moncreiff	Rector of the University of Edinburgh; 1871–1874	Succeeded by The Earl of Derby
Preceded by Ralph Anstruther	Rector of the University of St Andrews; 1862–1865	Succeeded by John Stuart Mill
Preceded by The Duke of Montrose	Chancellor of the University of Glasgow; 1875–1878	Succeeded by The Duke of Buccleuch
Baronetage of Nova Scotia
Preceded by John Maxwell	Baronet (of Pollok); 1865–1878	Succeeded by John Stirling Maxwell
