= Keir House =

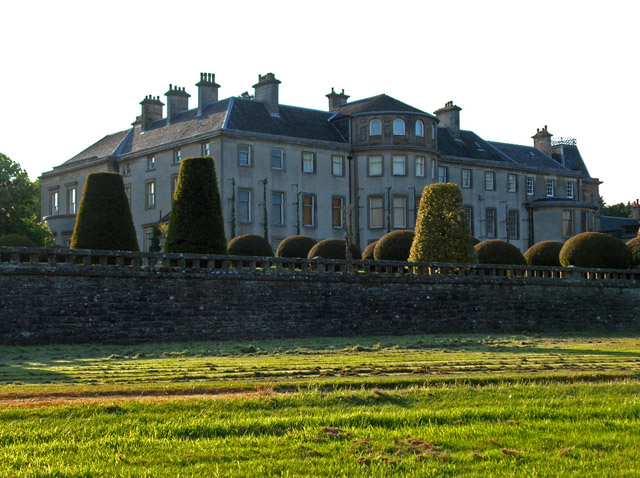
- East front of Keir House

- Location in Stirling council area
- 56.165902°N 3.982861°W

Listed Building – Category A
- Designated: 5 October 1971
- Reference no.: 3935

Inventory of Gardens and Designed Landscapes in Scotland
- Official name: Keir
- Criteria: Work of Art, Historical, Horticultural, Architectural
- Designated: 30 June 1987
- Reference no.: GDL00231

Keir House is a large country house near Stirling in central Scotland. It is located in the parish of Lecropt, 2.5 kilometres (1.6 mi) north-west of Bridge of Allan, in the former county of Perthshire. The estate was home to the Stirling family from the 15th to the 20th century. Keir House is protected as a category A listed building, and the grounds are included on the Inventory of Gardens and Designed Landscapes in Scotland, the national listing of significant gardens.

== History ==
The Keir estate was acquired by the Stirling family in 1448, and a house was built on it in the 16th century. The Stirlings supported the Jacobites during the 18th-century rebellions, and the estate was forfeited. However, they continued to live at Keir, and built the present house in around 1760. Income from the family's estates in Jamaica funded agricultural improvements and landscaping of the grounds.

The gardens were created in the 19th century as a miniature version of the Great Garden of Alloa 20 km to the south-east.

Additions were made to the house, including the south-west wing to designs by David Hamilton, completed in 1831. In 1847 Sir William Stirling Maxwell inherited the estate, and began a remodelling of the house and grounds. Architects Alfred Jenoure and William Stirling II worked on the house, while formal gardens were laid out by James Niven. A chapel was added in 1912, designed by Rowand Anderson and Paul, and with interior mosaic decoration by Boris Anrep. Sir William's grandson, Sir David Stirling, founder of the Special Air Service (SAS), was born at Keir in 1915.

In 1975 the house, together with 15,000 acres (6,100 ha), was sold by Bill Stirling of Keir for £2 million to Mahdi Al Tajir, a businessman from the United Arab Emirates.

== The estate ==
The estate is entered from the north-east via the New Lodge. Built in 1820 to Greek Revival designs by David Hamilton, this was originally the South Lodge, but was moved to its present location in 1969 when the M9 motorway was built through the eastern edge of the grounds. The Home Farm was built in 1832 and designed by David Bryce, but was elaborated by Sir William Stirling-Maxwell around 1858. The large steading includes a clock tower and a dairy with pictorial tiles.
