= Sir John Stirling-Maxwell, 10th Baronet =

British politician

Sir John Stirling-Maxwell Bt KT DL FRSE
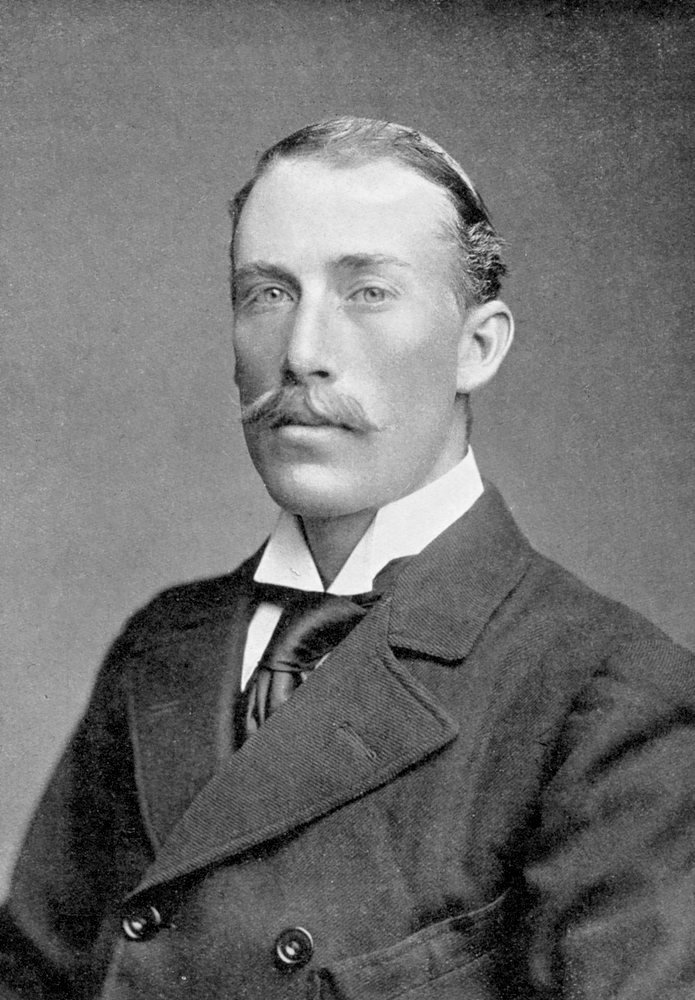
- Stirling-Maxwell in 1895

Member of Parliament for Glasgow College
- In office 1895–1906
- Preceded by: Sir Charles Cameron
- Succeeded by: Henry Anderson Watt

Personal details
- Born: John Maxwell Stirling-Maxwell; 6 June 1866 London, England
- Died: 30 May 1956 (aged 89) Pollok House, Glasgow, Scotland
- Party: Conservative
- Spouse: Ann Christian Maxwell
- Children: Anne Maxwell Macdonald, 11th Baronet
- Education: Eton College and Trinity College, Cambridge

Sir John Maxwell Stirling-Maxwell, 10th Baronet, KT, DL, FRSE (6 June 1866 – 30 May 1956) was a Scottish landowner, Tory politician and philanthropist.

== Life ==
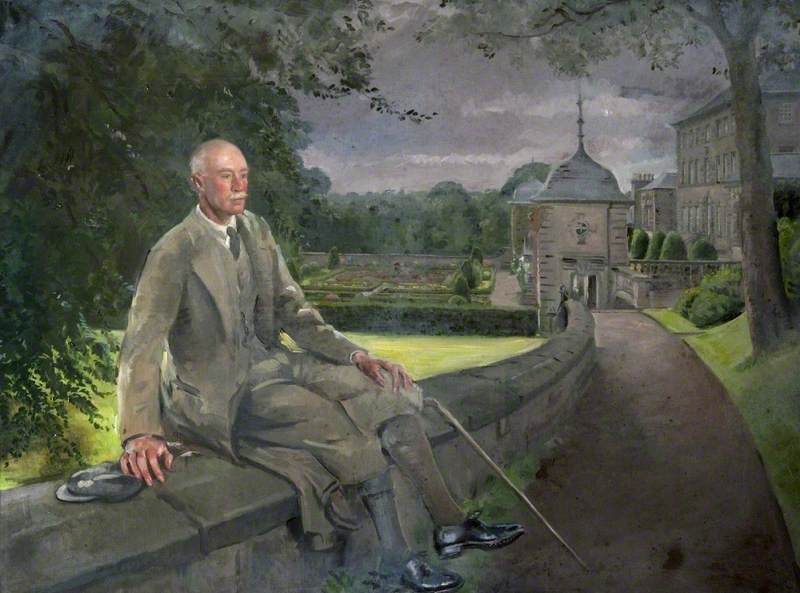
Sir John Stirling Maxwell (1866–1956), 10th Bt by William Bruce Ellis Ranken, Pollok House

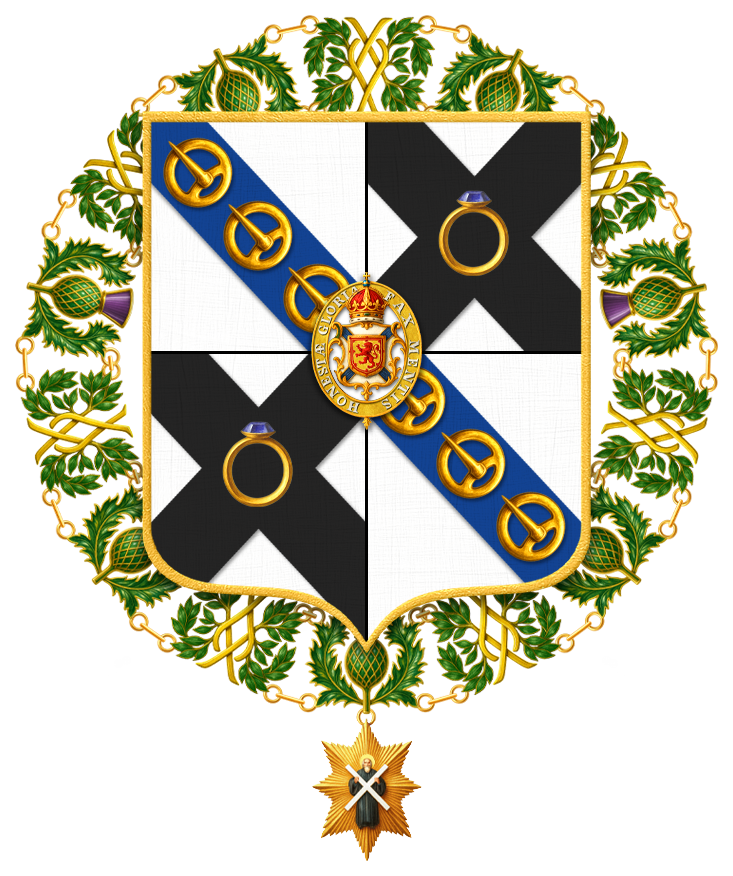
Shield of Arms of Sir John Maxwell Stirling-Maxwell, 10th Baronet, KT, DL, FRSE

The eldest son of Sir William Stirling-Maxwell, 9th Baronet and Lady Anna Maria Leslie-Melville, second daughter of David Leslie-Melville, 8th Earl of Leven and Elizabeth Anne Campbell, he was educated at Eton College and at Trinity College, Cambridge. He succeeded his father to the baronetcy in 1878.

He was the owner of the Corrour Estate in Lochaber from 1891 and a champion of afforestation in Scotland. From 1892, he planted a wide range of conifer and broadleaved tree species around Loch Ossian.

He was Conservative Member of Parliament for the College Division of Glasgow between 1895 and 1906, and later served as Chairman of the Forestry Commission from 1929–1932. He was also Chairman of the Royal Fine Art Commission for Scotland, and a Trustee of the National Galleries of Scotland, Chairman of Ancient Monuments Board. He was a Lieutenant in the Royal Company of Archers and an active Freemason, being a member of The Pollokshaws Royal Arch Lodge No. 153, a founding member of Lodge Blythswood No. 817, and an honorary member of Lodge Pollok, Pollokshields No. 772.

He was a founder member of the National Trust for Scotland (1931), becoming one of its first Vice-Presidents and President from 1943 until his death. He realised the importance of green spaces within a city. In this context, he was determined to protect the Pollok Estate and give the people of Glasgow access to it, which he undertook in 1911.

Stirling-Maxwell was also involved in trying to resolve the protracted problem of finding a home for the art treasures presented to Glasgow in 1944 by Sir William Burrell. After his death, his daughter gave Pollok House, a substantial proportion of the estate and her father's art collection to the Glasgow Corporation. This gift of land eventually allowed the Glasgow city fathers to erect a building to hold the Burrell Collection.

In 1929 he was appointed a Knight of the Thistle. He held the honorary degree of LLD from the University of Glasgow, the University of Aberdeen and Edinburgh University. Hon. RSA; Hon. RIBA; Hon. RWS; Hon. RSW and a DL. Sir John and Lady Stirling-Maxwell were both elected Fellows of the Royal Horticultural Society in 1902.

In 1938 he was elected a Fellow of the Royal Society of Edinburgh. His proposers were Sir Ernest Wedderburn, Sir John Sutherland, Sir Thomas Henry Holland and Sir William Wright Smith.

Sir John Stirling-Maxwell died at Pollok House on 30 May 1956.

== Family ==
On 12 November 1901 he married Ann Christian Maxwell, daughter of The Rt. Hon. Sir Herbert Maxwell, 7th Baronet, at Mochrum Parish Church in Mochrum in Wigtownshire. The couple had one daughter, Dame Anne Maxwell Macdonald, 11th Baronetess.

Parliament of the United Kingdom
Preceded by Sir Charles Cameron	Member of Parliament for Glasgow College; 1895–1906	Succeeded by Harry Watt
Baronetage of Nova Scotia
Preceded by William Stirling-Maxwell	Baronet (of Pollok); 1878–1956	Succeeded by Anne Maxwell Macdonald
