= Lanarkshire (UK Parliament constituency) =

Parliamentary constituency in the United Kingdom, 1801–1868

Coordinates: 55°35′N 3°50′W

- Former county constituency for the House of Commons
- Subdivision: county of Lanark

1708–1868
- Seats: One
- Replaced by: North Lanarkshire; South Lanarkshire

Lanarkshire was a Scottish county constituency of the House of Commons of Great Britain from 1708 and the House of Commons of the Parliament of the United Kingdom (Westminster) from 1801 to 1868. It elected one Member of Parliament (MP) by the first past the post voting system.

== Creation ==
The British parliamentary constituency was created in 1708 following the Acts of Union, 1707 and replaced the former Parliament of Scotland shire constituency of Lanarkshire.

== Boundaries ==
The constituency covered the whole of the Scottish county of Lanarkshire, apart from the Lanark Burghs.

== History ==
The constituency elected one Member of Parliament (MP) by the first past the post system until it was abolished for the 1868 general election.

In 1868 the constituency was replaced by the new constituencies of North Lanarkshire and South Lanarkshire.

== Members of Parliament ==
Year	Member	Party
1708	Lord Archibald Hamilton	Whig
1710	Sir James Hamilton of Rosehall	
1713	Sir James Hamilton of Rosehall	
1715	James Lockhart	
1718	Lord Archibald Hamilton	Whig
1722	Lord Archibald Hamilton	Whig
1727	Lord Archibald Hamilton	Whig
1734	Lord William Hamilton	
1735	Sir James Hamilton of Rosehall	
1741	Sir James Hamilton of Rosehall	
1747	Sir James Hamilton of Rosehall	
1750	Patrick Stuart	
1754	James Vere	Pro-Administration Whig
1760	Daniel Campbell	
1761	Daniel Campbell	
1768	John Lockhart-Ross	
1774	Andrew Stuart	
1780	Andrew Stuart	
1784	Sir James Denham-Steuart, Bt	Pittite
1790	Sir James Denham-Steuart, Bt	Pittite
1796	Sir James Denham-Steuart, Bt	Pittite
1801	Sir James Denham-Steuart, Bt	Pittite
1802	Lord Archibald Hamilton	Whig
1806	Lord Archibald Hamilton	Whig
1807	Lord Archibald Hamilton	Whig
1812	Lord Archibald Hamilton	Whig
1818	Lord Archibald Hamilton	Whig
1820	Lord Archibald Hamilton	Whig
1826	Lord Archibald Hamilton	Whig
1827	Sir Michael Shaw-Stewart of Greenock and Blackhall	Whig
1830	Charles Douglas, 1st Baron Douglas	Tory
1831	Charles Douglas, 1st Baron Douglas	Tory
1832	Sir John Maxwell of Pollok	Whig
1835	Sir John Maxwell of Pollok	Whig
1837	Alexander Macdonald Lockhart	Conservative
1841	William Lockhart	Conservative
1847	William Lockhart	Conservative
1852	William Lockhart	Conservative
1857	Alexander Baillie-Cochrane	Conservative
1857	Sir Thomas Colebrooke	Whig
1859	Sir Thomas Colebrooke	Liberal
1865	Sir Thomas Colebrooke	Liberal

== Election results ==
=== Elections in the 1830s ===
General election 1830: Lanarkshire
Party	Candidate	Votes	%
Tory	Charles Douglas	99	55.3
Whig	John Maxwell	80	44.7
Majority		19	10.6
Turnout		179	80.6
Registered electors		222	
Tory gain from Whig			

General election 1831: Lanarkshire
Party	Candidate	Votes	%	±%
Tory	Charles Douglas	93	53.1	−2.2
Whig	John Maxwell	82	46.9	+2.2
Majority		11	6.2	−4.4
Turnout		175	78.8	−1.8
Registered electors		222		
Tory hold		Swing	−2.2	

General election 1832: Lanarkshire
Party	Candidate	Votes	%	±%
Whig	John Maxwell	1,555	70.7	+23.8
Tory	Robert Carrick Buchanan	615	28.0	−25.1
Radical	Archibald James Hamilton	30	1.4	N/A
Majority		940	42.7	N/A
Turnout		2,200	81.3	+2.5
Registered electors		2,705		
Whig gain from Tory		Swing	+24.5	

General election 1835: Lanarkshire
Party	Candidate	Votes	%	±%
Whig	John Maxwell	1,251	52.8	−17.9
Conservative	Alexander Macdonald Lockhart	1,117	47.2	+19.2
Majority		134	5.6	−37.1
Turnout		2,368	78.2	−3.1
Registered electors		3,030		
Whig hold		Swing	−18.6	

General election 1837: Lanarkshire
Party	Candidate	Votes	%	±%
Conservative	Alexander Macdonald Lockhart	1,486	50.0	+2.8
Whig	Charles Murray	1,485	50.0	−2.8
Majority		1	0.0	N/A
Turnout		2,971	81.3	+3.1
Registered electors		3,654		
Conservative gain from Whig		Swing	+2.8	

=== Elections in the 1840s ===
General election 1841: Lanarkshire
Party	Candidate	Votes	%	±%
Conservative	William Lockhart	Unopposed		
Registered electors		3,964		
Conservative hold				

General election 1847: Lanarkshire
Party	Candidate	Votes	%	±%
Conservative	William Lockhart	Unopposed		
Registered electors		3,687		
Conservative hold				

=== Elections in the 1850s ===
General election 1852: Lanarkshire
Party	Candidate	Votes	%	±%
Conservative	William Lockhart	Unopposed		
Registered electors		3,471		
Conservative hold				

Lockhart's death caused a by-election.

By-election, 5 January 1857: Lanarkshire
Party	Candidate	Votes	%	±%
Conservative	Alexander Baillie-Cochrane	Unopposed		
Conservative hold				

General election 1857: Lanarkshire
Party	Candidate	Votes	%	±%
Whig	Edward Colebrooke	1,233	50.7	New
Conservative	Alexander Baillie-Cochrane	1,197	49.3	N/A
Majority		36	1.4	N/A
Turnout		2,430	77.8	N/A
Registered electors		3,826		
Whig gain from Conservative		Swing	N/A	

General election 1859: Lanarkshire
Party	Candidate	Votes	%	±%
Liberal	Edward Colebrooke	Unopposed		
Registered electors		3,826		
Liberal hold				

=== Elections in the 1860s ===
General election 1865: Lanarkshire
Party	Candidate	Votes	%	±%
Liberal	Edward Colebrooke	Unopposed		
Registered electors		5,183		
Liberal hold				
