= Eilean Tigh =

Island of the Inner Hebrides, Scotland

Eilean Taighe (Gaelic)

Location
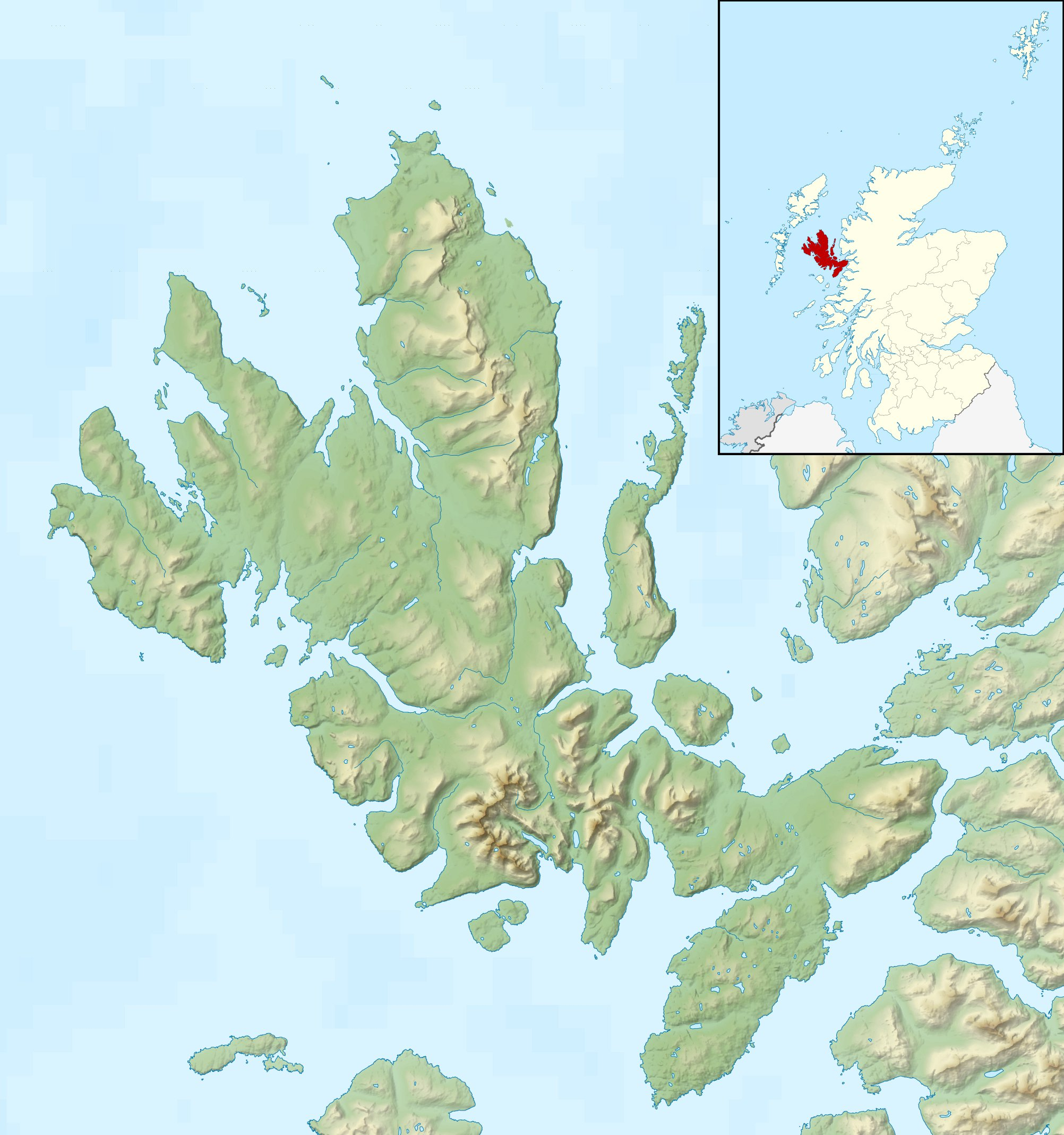
- Location within Isle of Skye
- OS grid reference: NG603538
- Coordinates: 57.511°N 6.003°W

Name
- Name meaning: House Island

Physical geography
- Island group: Skye
- Area: 54 ha
- Area rank: 195
- Highest elevation: Meall Mòr, 111 m

Administration
- Council area: Highland
- Country: Scotland
- Sovereign state: United Kingdom

Eilean Tigh (Scottish Gaelic: Eilean Taighe) is a tidal island in the Sound of Raasay of Scotland, that lies between Rona and Raasay.

Approximately 54 hectares (130 acres) in extent, the island was once settled and the ruins of various structures are still visible at the south end. "Eilean Tigh" is a Gaelic name that means "house island" or "home island".

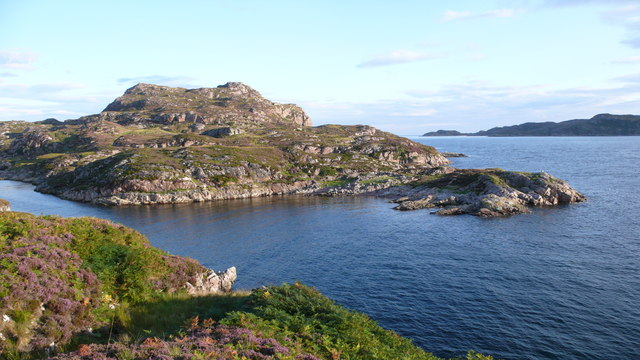
Eilean Tigh from Raasay

It is a rugged island and the coastline is largely cliff-lined and rocky. Eilean Tigh is connected to the northern tip of neighbouring Raasay at low tides by a rocky ledge that crosses Caol Eilean Tigh. Rona lies about one kilometre (1/2 nautical mile) away across the straits of Caol Rona at the centre of which is tiny Eilean an Fhraoich (English: heather island). On the Rona side are Garbh Eilean (rough island) and Eilean Seamraig. Eilean Fladday is two kilometres (1 nmi) south and Skye is some six kilometres (3 nmi) west across the Sound.

There are good anchorages nearby off Eilean Fladday and Rona, but the nearest road stops at Arnish on Raasay, from where it is about a two-hour walk to Eilean Tigh. The northwestern tip of the island is Rubha na Cloich' Uaine – the point of the green stone.
