= Brochel Castle =

Ruins of castle

- Raasay
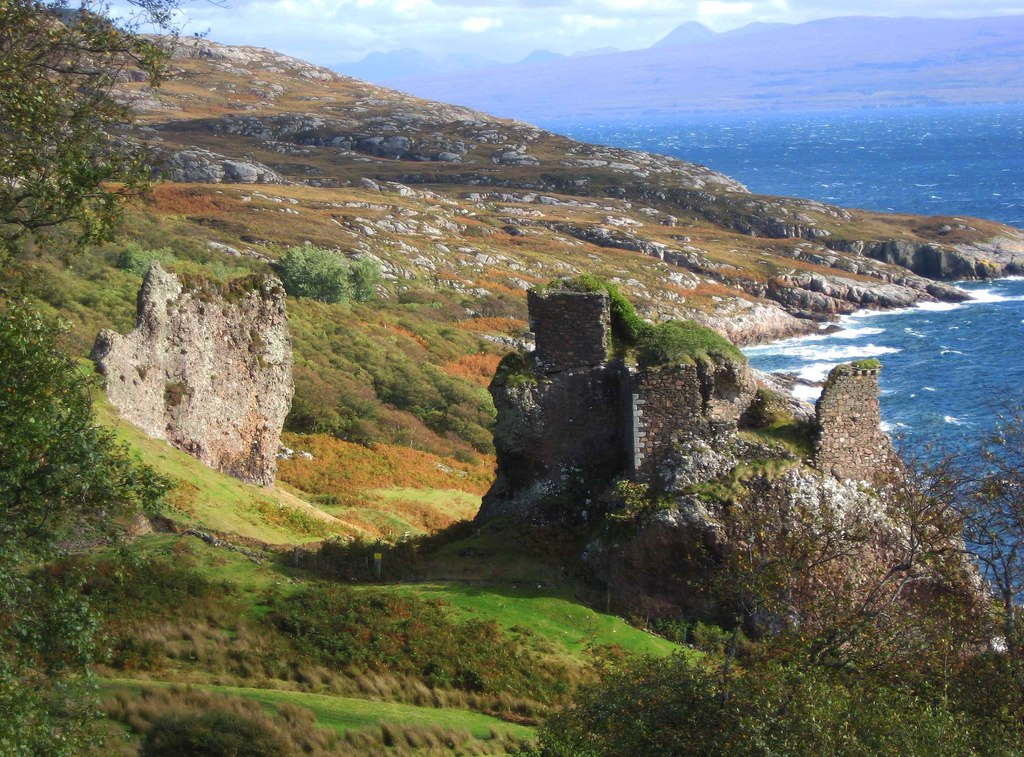
- Brochel Castle

Site information
- Type: Stronghold built circa C15
- Open to the public: Yes
- Condition: Ruined

Location
- Brochel Castle
- Coordinates: 57.442°N 6.028°W

Site history
- In use: Until c. 1671; 355 years ago
- Materials: Sandstone, basalt

Brochel Castle is a ruined castle located on a 15-metre-high rocky pinnacle on the north-eastern shore of Raasay, in the council area of Highland, Scotland.

== History ==
The castle existed by 1549 and was probably built in the preceding century. The Castle was likely built by Raasay's first MacLeod chief, Calum Garbh (later known as Calum MacGilleChaluim), who inherited the islands of Raasay and Rona from his father, Calum MacLeod, the 9th Chief of Lewis. In 1911, the ruins were acquired by the company Baird & Co (Ironmasters), which sold them on to the Board of Agriculture for Scotland in 1922.
