= Arnish =

Arnish ((Devanagari: अर्निश or अर्निष )) is a modern Hindu name which means "Lord of the Seas."

Arnish or Airinis may also refer to several places in Scotland:

- Arnish, Raasay, a settlement on the island of Raasay
- Arnish, a place near Stornoway, in Lewis, the site of a fabrication yard
