= Scottish Gaelic orthography =

Scottish Gaelic orthography has evolved over many centuries and is heavily etymologizing in its modern form. This means the orthography tends to preserve historical components rather than operating on the principles of a phonemic orthography where the graphemes correspond directly to phonemes. This allows the same written form in Scottish Gaelic to result in a multitude of pronunciations, depending on the spoken variant of Scottish Gaelic. For example, the word coimhead ('watching') may result in [ˈkʰõ.ət̪], [ˈkʰɔ̃jət̪], [ˈkʰɤi.ət̪], or [ˈkʰɛ̃.ət̪]. Conversely, it allows the sometimes highly divergent phonetic forms to be covered by a single written form, rather than requiring multiple written forms.

== Alphabet ==
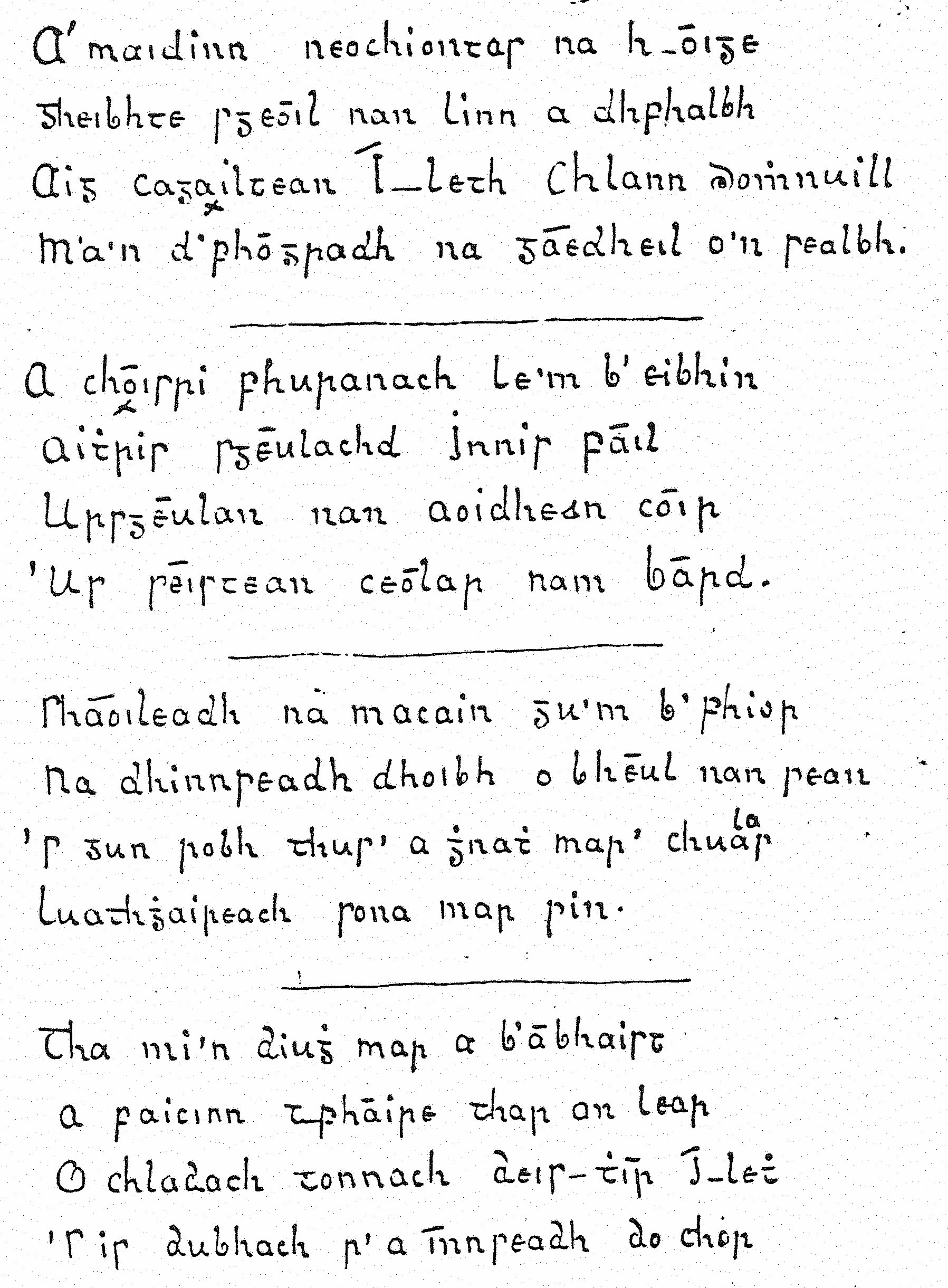
A' maidin neochiontas na h-óige (Uilleam MacDhunléibhe, 19th century)

The alphabet (Scottish Gaelic: aibidil, formerly Beith Luis Nuin from the first three letters of the Ogham alphabet) now used for writing Scottish Gaelic consists of the following Latin script letters, whether written in Roman type or Gaelic type:

⟨a, b, c, d, e, f, g, h, i, l, m, n, o, p, r, s, t, u⟩

Vowels may be accented with a grave accent but accented letters are not considered distinct letters. Prior the 1981 Gaelic Orthographic Convention (GOC), Scottish Gaelic traditionally used acute accents on ⟨a, e, o⟩ to denote close-mid long vowels, clearly graphemically distinguishing ⟨è⟩ /ɛː/ and ⟨é⟩ /eː/, and ⟨ò⟩ /ɔː/ and ⟨ó⟩ /oː/. However, since the 1981 GOC and its 2005 and 2009 revisions, standard orthography only uses the grave accent. (Note: Windows PCs and Chromebooks supplied in the British Isles have an English-Irish keyboard mapping by default, which includes support for acute accents as standard (using AltGr+a to produce á, for example). To produce grave accents (as in à for example, produced using `a) the user must install a "UK extended" mapping, available free from Microsoft and Google.) Since the 1980s, the acute accent has not been used in Scottish high school examination papers, and many publishers have adopted the Scottish Qualifications Authority's orthographic conventions for their books. Despite this, traditional spelling is still used by some writers and publishers, although not always intentionally. In Nova Scotia, the 2009 Gaelic language curriculum guidelines follow the 2005 GOC orthography, but do not change the traditional spelling of words and phrases common to Nova Scotia or in pre–spelling-reform literature.

=== Letter names ===
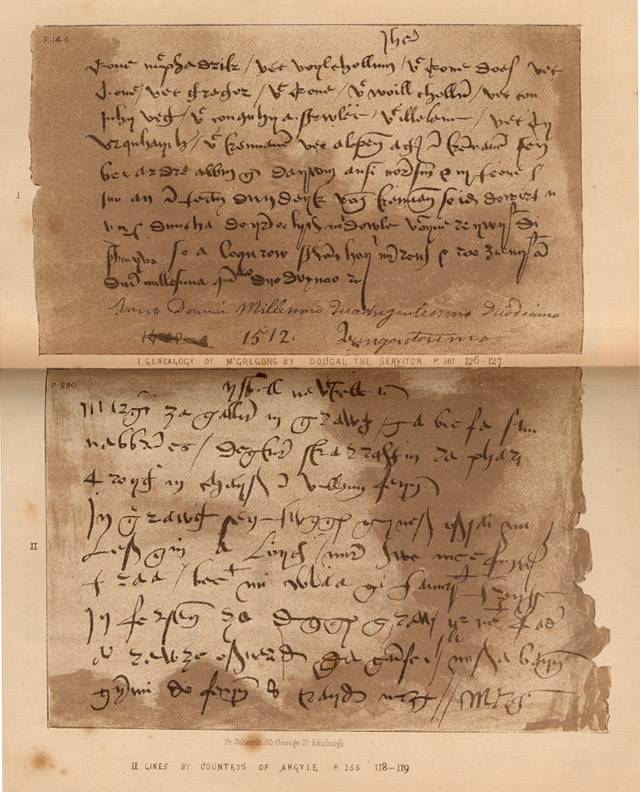
Page from the Book of the Dean of Lismore (early 16th century); it is written in Gaelic using secretary hand, the style of handwriting conventionally used at the time

The early Medieval treatise Auraicept na n-Éces ('The Scholars' Primer') describes the origin of alphabets from the Tower of Babel. It assigns plant names and meanings to the Ogham alphabet, to a lesser extent to Norse Younger Futhark runes, and by extension to Latin letters when used to write Gaelic. Robert Graves' book The White Goddess has been a major influence on assigning divinatory meanings to the tree symbolism. (See also Bríatharogam.) Some of the names differ from their modern equivalents (e.g. dair > darach, suil > seileach).

Letter	Name(s) (meaning)
Aa	Ailm (elm)
Bb	Beith (silver birch)
Cc	Coll (hazel)
Dd	Dair (oak)
Ee	Eadha (aspen)
Ff	Feàrn (alder)
Gg	Gort (ivy)
Hh	Uath (hawthorn)
Ii	Iogh (yew)
Ll	Luis (rowan)
Mm	Muin (vine)
Nn	Nuin (ash)
Oo	Onn (furze)
Oo	Oir (spindle)
Pp	Peith (downy birch)
Rr	Ruis (elder)
Ss	Suil (willow)
Tt	Teine (furze)
Uu	Ura (heather)

== Consonants ==
The consonant letters generally correspond to the consonant phonemes as shown in this table. See Scottish Gaelic phonology for an explanation of the symbols used. Consonants are "broad" (velarised) when the nearest vowel letter is one of ⟨a, o, u⟩ and "slender" (palatalised) when the nearest vowel letter is one of ⟨e, i⟩. A back vowel is one of the following; [o(ː) ɔ(ː) ɤ(ː) u(ː) ɯ(ː) a(ː) au]; a front vowel is any other kind of vowel.

Letter(s)			Phoneme	Examples
b	broad		/p/	bàta /ˈpaːʰt̪ə/, borb /ˈpɔɾɔp/
b	slender	before front vowel, or finally	/p/	bean /pɛn/, caibe /ˈkʰapə/, guib /kɤp/
b	slender	before back vowel	/pj/	beò /pjɔː/, bealltainn /ˈpjaul̪ˠt̪ɪɲ/, bealach /ˈpjal̪ˠəx/
bh	between vowels, sometimes		/./	siubhal /ˈʃu.əl̪ˠ/, iubhar /ˈju.əɾ/
bh	finally, sometimes		none	dubh /t̪u/, ubh /u/
bh	usually	broad	/v/	cabhag /ˈkʰavak/, sàbh /s̪aːv/
bh	usually	slender, before front vowel	/v/	dhuibh /ˈɣɯiv/, dibhe /ˈtʲivə/
bh	usually	slender, before back vowel	/vj/	ro bheò /ɾɔ vjɔː/, dà bhealltainn /t̪aː ˈvjaul̪ˠt̪ɪɲ/
bh	see below for ⟨abh, oibh⟩ when they precede consonants			
c	broad	initially, or non-finally after consonant	/kʰ/	cas /kʰas̪/, cam /kʰaum/
c	broad	between vowels	/ʰk/	bacadh /ˈpaʰkəɣ/, mucan /ˈmuʰkən/
c	broad	finally after vowel	/ʰk/	mac /maʰk/
c	broad	finally after consonant	/k/	corc /kʰɔɾʰk/
c	slender	initially or after consonant	/kʰʲ/	ceòl /kʰʲɔːl̪ˠ/, ceum /kʰʲeːm/
c	slender	between vowels	/ʰkʲ/	lice /ˈʎiʰkʲə/, brice /ˈpɾʲiʰkʲə/
c	slender	finally after vowel	/ʰkʲ/	mic /miʰkʲ/
c	slender	finally after consonant	/kʲ/	cuilc /kʰulʰkʲ/
ch	broad		/x/	loch /l̪ˠɔx/, dòchas /ˈt̪ɔːxəs̪/
ch	slender		/ç/	deich /tʲeç/, dìcheall /ˈtʲiːçəl̪ˠ/
chd			/xk/	lionntachd /ˈʎuːn̪ˠt̪əxk/, doimhneachd /ˈt̪ɔiɲəxk/
cn			/kʰɾ/	cneap /kʰɾʲɛʰp/, cneasta /ˈkʰɾʲes̪t̪ə/
d	broad		/t̪/	cadal /ˈkʰat̪əl̪ˠ/, fada /ˈfat̪ə/
d	slender		/tʲ/	diùid /tʲuːtʲ/, dearg /ˈtʲɛɾak/
dh	in final -⟨(a)idh⟩		none	pòsaidh /ˈpʰɔːs̪ɪ/, rèidh /rˠeː/
dh	broad	between vowels	/./	odhar /ˈo.ər/, cladhadh /ˈkʰl̪ˠɤ.əɣ/
dh	broad	between vowels	/ɣ/	modhail /ˈmɔɣal/
dh	broad	elsewhere	/ɣ/	dhà /ɣaː/, modh /mɔɣ/, tumadh /ˈt̪ʰuməɣ/
dh	slender	between vowels	/./	Gàidheal /ˈkɛː.əl̪ˠ/
dh	slender	elsewhere	/ʝ/	dhìth /ʝiː/, dhìol /ʝiəl̪ˠ/
dh	see below for ⟨adh, aidh, iodh⟩ when they precede consonants			
f	broad		/f/	fathan /ˈfahan/, gafann /ˈkafən̪ˠ/
f	slender	before front vowel	/f/	fios /fis̪/, fèill /feːʎ/
f	slender	before back vowel	/fj/	fiùran /ˈfjuːɾan/, feòl /fjɔːl̪ˠ/
fh	usual		none	fhios /is̪/, a fharadh /ˈaɾəɣ/
fh	exceptionally		/h/	fhathast /ha.əs̪t̪/, fhèin /heːn/, fhuair /huəɾʲ/
g	broad		/k/	gad /kat̪/, ugan /ˈukan/
g	slender		/kʲ/	gille /ˈkʲiʎə/, leig /ʎekʲ/
gh	finally, sometimes		none*	an-diugh /əɲˈtʲu/, nigh /ɲiː/
gh	between vowels		/./*	aghaidh /ˈɤː.ɪ/, fiughar /ˈfju.əɾ/, nigheann /ˈɲiː.an̪ˠ/
gh	between vowels		/ɣ/	laghail /ˈl̪ˠɤɣal/
gh	elsewhere	broad	/ɣ/	mo ghoc /mə ɣɔʰk/, lagh /l̪ˠɤɣ/
gh	elsewhere	slender	/ʝ/	mo ghille /mə ʝiʎə/, do thaigh /t̪ə hɤj/
gh	see below for lengthened ⟨agh, aigh, eagh, iogh, ogh, oigh⟩ when preceding another consonant			
gn			/kr/	gnè /kɾʲɛː/
h			/h/	a h-athair /ə hahɪɾʲ/, Hearach /ˈhɛɾəx/
l	broad		/l̪ˠ/	lachan /ˈl̪ˠaxən/, a laoidh /ə l̪ˠɯj/, balach /ˈpal̪ˠəx/
l	slender	initially, unlenited	/ʎ/	leabaidh /ˈʎepɪ/, leum /ʎeːm/
l	slender	initially, lenited	/l/	dà leabaidh /t̪aː lepɪ/, bho leac /vɔ lɛʰk/
l	slender	elsewhere	/l/	cuilean /ˈkʰulan/, sùil /s̪uːl/
ll	broad		/l̪ˠ/	balla /ˈpal̪ˠə/, ciall /kʰʲiəl̪ˠ/
ll	slender		/ʎ/	cailleach /ˈkʰaʎəx/, mill /miːʎ/
m	broad		/m/	maol /mɯːl̪ˠ/, màla /ˈmaːl̪ˠə/
m	slender	before front vowel	/m/	milis /ˈmilɪʃ/, tìm /tʰʲiːm/
m	slender	before back vowel	/mj/	meall /mjaul̪ˠ/, meòg /mjɔːk/
mh	between vowels, sometimes		/./	comhairle /ˈkʰo.əɾlə/
mh	broad		/v/	àmhainn /ˈaːvɪɲ/, caomh /kʰɯːv/
mh	slender	before front vowel	/v/	caoimhin /ˈkʰɯːvɪɲ/, làimh /ˈl̪ˠaiv/
mh	slender	before back vowel	/vj/	do mhealladh /t̪ɔ ˈvjal̪ˠəɣ/, dà mheall /t̪aː vjaul̪ˠ/
mh	see below for ⟨amh, eadh, oimh, uimh⟩ when they precede consonants			
n	broad	initially, unlenited	/n̪ˠ/	nàbaidh /ˈn̪ˠaːpi/, norrag /ˈn̪ˠɔrˠak/
n	broad	initially, lenited	/n/	mo nàire /mɔ ˈnaːɾʲɪ/, bho nàbaidh /vɔ ˈnaːpɪ/
n	broad	elsewhere	/n/	dona /ˈt̪ɔnə/, sean /ʃɛn/
n	slender	initially, unlenited	/ɲ/	neul /ɲial̪ˠ/, neart /ɲɛɾʃt̪/
n	slender	initially, lenited	/n/	mo nighean /mɔ ˈni.an/, dà nead /t̪aː nɛt̪/
n	slender	elsewhere, after back vowel	/ɲ/	duine /ˈt̪ɯɲə/, càineadh /ˈkʰaːɲəɣ/
n	slender	elsewhere, after front vowel	/n/	cana /ˈkʰanə/, teine /ˈtʰʲenə/
ng	broad		/ŋɡ/	teanga /ˈtʰʲɛŋɡə/, fulang /ˈful̪ˠəŋɡ/
ng	slender		/ŋʲɡʲ/	aingeal /ˈaiŋʲɡʲəl̪ˠ/, farsaing /ˈfaɾs̪ɪŋʲɡʲ/
nn	broad		/n̪ˠ/	ceannaich /ˈkʰʲan̪ˠɪç/, ann /aun̪ˠ/
nn	slender		/ɲ/	bainne /ˈpaɲə/, tinn /tʰʲiːɲ/
p	broad slender not before back vowel	initially or after consonant	/pʰ/	post /pʰɔs̪t̪/, campa /ˈkʰaumpə/, peasair /ˈpʰes̪ɪɾʲ/,
p	broad slender not before back vowel	between vowels	/ʰp/	cupa /ˈkʰuʰpə/, cipean /ˈkʰʲiʰpan/
p	broad slender not before back vowel	finally after vowel	/ʰp/	cuip /ˈkʰuiʰp/
p	broad slender not before back vowel	finally after consonant	/p/	ailp /alp/
p	slender before back vowel	after consonant, or initially	/pʰj/	piuthar /ˈpʰju.əɾ/, peall /pʰjaul̪ˠ/
ph	broad		/f/	sa phost /s̪ə fɔs̪t̪/, bho phàiste /vɔ ˈfaːʃtʲə/
ph	slender	before front vowel	/f/	dà pheasair /t̪aː ˈfes̪ɪɾʲ/, mo pheata /mɔ ˈfɛʰt̪ə/
ph	slender	before back vowel	/fj/	mo phiuthar /mɔ ˈfju.əɾ/, sa pheann /s̪ə fjaun̪ˠ/
r	initially, unlenited		/rˠ/	ràmh /rˠaːv/, rionnag /ˈrˠun̪ˠak/
r	initially, lenited		/ɾ/	do rùn /tɔ ɾuːn/, bho rèic /vɔ ɾeːʰkʲ/
r	elsewhere	broad	/ɾ/	caran /ˈkʰaɾan/, mura /ˈmuɾə/
r	elsewhere	slender	/ɾʲ/	cìr /kʰʲiːɾʲ/, cuireadh /ˈkʰuɾʲəɣ/
rr			/rˠ/	cearr /kʰʲaːrˠ/, barra /ˈparˠə/
-rt, -rd			/ɾʃt̪/	neart /ɲɛɾʃt̪/, bord /pɔːɾʃt̪/
s	broad		/s̪/	sàr /s̪aːɾ/, casan /ˈkʰas̪an/
s	slender		/ʃ/	siùcair /ˈʃuːʰkɪɾʲ/, càise /ˈkʰaːʃə/
sh	broad		/h/	ro shalach /ɾɔ ˈhal̪ˠəx/, glè shoilleir /kleː ˈhɤʎɪɾʲ/
sh	slender	before front vowel	/h/	dà shìl /t̪aː hiːʎ/, glè shean /kleː hɛn/
sh	slender	before back vowel	/hj/	de shiùcair /tʲe ˈhjuːʰkɪɾʲ/, a sheòladh /ə ˈhjɔːl̪ˠəɣ/
sr, str			/s̪t̪ɾ/	sràc /s̪t̪ɾaːʰk/, strì /s̪t̪ɾʲiː/
t	broad	initially, or non-finally after consonant	/t̪ʰ/	tasdan /ˈt̪ʰas̪t̪an/, molta /ˈmɔl̪ˠt̪ə/
t	broad	between vowels	/ʰt̪/	bàta /ˈpaːʰt̪ə/
t	broad	finally, after vowel	/ʰt̪/	put /pʰuʰt̪/
t	broad	finally, after consonant	/t/	
t	slender	initially, or non-finally after consonant	/tʰʲ/	tiugh /tʰʲu/, caillte /ˈkʰaiʎtʲə/
t	slender	between vowels	/ʰtʲ/	litir /ˈʎiʰtʲɪɾʲ/
t	slender	finally, after vowel	/ʰtʲ/	cait /kʰɛʰtʲ/
t	slender	finally, after consonant	/tʲ/	ailt /altʲ/
th	finally		none	teth /tʰʲe/, leth /ʎe/, strath /s̪t̪ɾa/
th	between vowels		/./	leotha /ˈlɔ.ə/, piuthar /ˈpʰju.əɾ/, cnòthan /ˈkɾɔː.ən/
th	between vowels		/h/	beatha /ˈpɛhə/, fathan /ˈfahan/, a mhàthair /ə ˈvaːhɪɾʲ/
th	initially	broad	/h/	mo thòn /mɔ hɔːn/, do thaigh /t̪ɔ hɤʝ/
th	initially	slender, before front vowel	/h/	thig /hikʲ/, ro thinn /rˠɔ hiːɲ/
th	initially	slender, before back vowel	/hj/	do theaghlach /t̪ɔ ˈhjɔːl̪ˠəx/, glè thiugh /kleː hju/

== Vowels ==
Many of the rules in this section only apply in stressed syllables. In unstressed syllables, the range of vowels is highly restricted, mainly /ə, ɪ, a/ appearing and on occasion /ɔ/. Only certain vowel graphs appear in unstressed syllables: ⟨a, ai, e, ea, ei, i⟩ and very infrequently ⟨o, oi, u, ui⟩.

Letter(s)			Phoneme(s)	Examples
a	unstressed	in -⟨ag⟩ in -⟨an⟩ (when not plural)	/a/	cnèatag /ˈkʰɾʲiaʰt̪ak/, luchag /ˈl̪ˠuxak/ lochan /ˈl̪ˠɔxan/, beagan /ˈpekan/
a	unstressed	elsewhere	/ə/	balach /ˈpal̪ˠəx/, balla /ˈpal̪ˠə/
a	stressed	before ⟨dh, gh⟩ + vowel or word finally	/ɤ/	dragh /t̪ɾɤɣ/, laghail /ˈl̪ˠɤɣal/
a	stressed	before ⟨ll, m, nn⟩ + consonant or word finally	/au/	bann /paun̪ˠ/, calltainn /ˈkʰaul̪ˠt̪ɪɲ/, campa /ˈkʰaumpə/
a	stressed	before ⟨rr⟩ + consonant or word finally before ⟨rn, rd⟩	/aː/	barr /paːrˠ/, carnadh /ˈkʰaːɾnəɣ/
a	stressed	elsewhere	/a/	acras /ˈaʰkɾəs̪/, gealladh /ˈkʲal̪ˠəɣ/, barra /ˈparˠə/
a	See below for ⟨abh, adh, agh, amh⟩ when they precede consonants			
ai	unstressed	in -⟨ail⟩	/a/	modhail /ˈmɔɣal/, eudail /ˈeːt̪al/
ai	unstressed	elsewhere	/ɪ/ /e/ /ə/	caraich /ˈkʰaɾɪç/, mholainn /ˈvɔl̪ˠɪɲ/ air an fhèill /eɾʲəˈɲeːʎ/ comhairle /ˈkʰo.əɾlə/
ai	stressed	before ⟨ll, m, nn⟩ + consonant or word finally before ⟨bh, mh⟩ + consonant	/ai/	caill /ˈkʰaiʎ/, cainnt /ˈkʰaiɲtʲ/ aibhne /ˈaivɲə/, aimhreid /ˈaivɾʲɪtʲ/
ai	stressed	before ⟨rr⟩ + consonant or word finally before ⟨rn, rd⟩	/aː/	aird /aːɾʃt̪/
ai	stressed	elsewhere	/a/	baile /ˈpalə/, lainnir /ˈl̪ˠaɲɪɾʲ/
ai	See below for ⟨aidh⟩, ⟨aigh⟩ when they precede consonants			
à			/aː/	àlainn /ˈaːl̪ˠɪɲ/, bràmar /ˈpɾaːməɾ/
ài			/aː/ /ɛː/	àite /ˈaːʰtʲə/, càil /kʰaːl/ Gàidheal /ˈkɛː.əl̪ˠ/, pàipear /ˈpʰɛːʰpəɾ/
ao			/ɯː/	maol /mɯːl̪ˠ/, caomh /kʰɯːv/
aoi	before ⟨mh, bh⟩ + consonant or word finally		/ɯi/	aoibhneas /ˈɯivɲəs̪/, caoimhneas /ˈkʰɯivɲəs̪/
aoi	elsewhere		/ɯː/	faoileag /ˈfɯːlak/, caoimhin /ˈkʰɯːvɪɲ/
e	unstressed		/ə/	maise /ˈmaʃə/, cuine /ˈkʰuɲə/
e	stressed		/e/	teth /tʰʲe/, le /le/
ea	unstressed	in -⟨eag⟩	/a/	faoileag /ˈfɯːlak/, uiseag /ˈɯʃak/
ea	unstressed	elsewhere	/ə/	rinnear /ˈrˠiɲəɾ/, mìltean /ˈmiːltʲən/
ea	stressed	before ⟨dh, gh⟩ finally	/ɤ/	feadh /fjɤɣ/, seagh /ʃɤɣ/
ea	stressed	before ⟨d, g, s⟩	/e/	eadar /ˈet̪əɾ/, creagan /ˈkʰɾʲekən/
ea	stressed	before ⟨ll, nn⟩ + consonant or word finally	/au/	peann /pʰjaun̪ˠ/, teannta /ˈtʰʲaun̪ˠt̪ə/
ea	stressed	before ⟨rr⟩ + consonant or word finally before ⟨rn⟩	/aː/	fearna /ˈfjaːɾnə/, dearrsadh /ˈtʲaːrˠs̪əɣ/
ea	stressed	before ⟨ll, nn, rr⟩ + vowel, initially	/ja/	eallach /ˈjal̪ˠəx/, earrach /ˈjarˠəx/
ea	stressed	before ⟨ll, nn, rr⟩ + vowel, elsewhere	/a/	ceannard /ˈkʰʲan̪ˠəɾʃt̪/, gealladh /ˈkʲal̪ˠəɣ/
ea	stressed	elsewhere	/ɛ/	fear /fɛɾ/, earrann /ˈjarˠən̪ˠ/
ea	See below for ⟨eagh, eamh⟩ when they precede consonants			
èa			/ia/	dèan /ˈtʲian/, cnèatag /ˈkʰɾʲiaʰt̪ak/
ei	unstressed		/ɪ/	aimhreid /ˈaivɾʲɪtʲ/, bigein /ˈpikʲəɲ/
ei	stressed	before ⟨ll, m, nn⟩ + consonant or word finally	/ei/	greim /ˈkɾʲeim/, peinnsean /ˈpʰeiɲʃan/
ei	stressed	elsewhere	/e/	ceist /kʰʲeʃtʲ/, seinneadair /ˈʃeɲət̪ɪɾʲ/
è, èi			/ɛː/ /eː/	crè /kʰɾʲɛː/, sèimh /ʃɛːv/ dè /tʲeː/, cèile /ˈkʰʲeːlə/
eo			/ɔ/	deoch /tʲɔx/, leotha /ˈlɔ.ə/
eò, eòi	initially		/jɔː/	eòlas /ˈjɔːl̪ˠəs̪/, eòin /jɔːɲ/
eò, eòi	elsewhere		/ɔː/	seòl /ʃɔːl̪ˠ/, meòir /mjɔːɾʲ/
eu	before ⟨m⟩ or in literary words		/eː/	Seumas /ˈʃeːməs̪/, leum /ʎeːm/, treun /t̪ʰɾʲeːn/
eu	elsewhere		/ia/	ceud /kʰʲiat̪/, feur /fiaɾ/
i	unstressed		/ɪ/	litir /ˈʎiʰtʲɪɾʲ/, fuirich /ˈfuɾʲɪç/
i	stressed	before ⟨ll, m, nn⟩ + consonant or word finally	/iː/	till /tʰʲiːʎ/, sinnsear /ˈʃiːɲʃəɾ/
i	stressed	elsewhere	/i/	thig /hikʲ/, tinneas /ˈtʰʲiɲəs̪/
ì			/iː/	cìr /kʰʲiːɾʲ/, rìbhinn /ˈrˠiːvɪɲ/
ia			/iə/ /ia/	liath /ʎiə/, iarraidh /ˈiərˠɪ/ sgian /s̪kʲian/, dia /tʲia/
io	before ⟨ll, nn⟩ + consonant or word finally	initially	/ju/	ionnsaich /ˈjuːn̪ˠs̪ɪç/
io	before ⟨ll, nn⟩ + consonant or word finally	elsewhere	/uː/	lionn /ʎuːn̪ˠ/, fionntach /ˈfjuːn̪ˠt̪əx/
io	before ⟨ll, nn⟩ + vowel		/u/	fionnar /ˈfjun̪ˠəɾ/, sionnach /ˈʃun̪ˠəx/
io	elsewhere		/i/	fios /fis̪/, lios /ʎis̪/
io	See below for ⟨iodh, iogh⟩ when they precedes consonants			
ìo			/iə/	mìos /miəs̪/, cìoch /kʰʲiəx/
iu	initially		/ju/	iubhar /ˈju.əɾ/
iu	before ⟨rr, rs⟩		/uː/	ciurr /kʰʲuːrˠ/, siursach /ˈʃuːɾs̪əx/
iu	elsewhere		/u/	fliuch /flux/, siubhal /ˈʃu.əl̪ˠ/
iù, iùi			/uː/	diù /tʲuː/, ciùil /kʰʲuːl/
o	before ⟨b, bh, g, gh, mh⟩ or ⟨m⟩ + vowel		/o/	gob /kop/, bogha /ˈpo.ə/
o	before ⟨ll, m, nn⟩ + consonant or word finally		/ɔu/	tom /ˈt̪ʰɔum/, tolltach /ˈt̪ʰɔul̪ˠt̪əx/
o	before ⟨rr⟩ + consonant or word finally before ⟨rn, rd⟩		/ɔː/	torr /t̪ʰɔːrˠ/, dornan /ˈt̪ɔːɾnan/
o	elsewhere		/ɔ/	loch /l̪ˠɔx/, follais /ˈfɔl̪ˠɪʃ/, dorra /ˈt̪ɔrˠə/
o	See below for ⟨ogh⟩ when it comes before consonants			
oi	before ⟨b, bh, g, gh, mh⟩ or ⟨m⟩ + vowel		/o/	
oi	before ⟨ll, m, nn⟩ + consonant or word finally		/əi/	broinn /pɾəiɲ/, oillt /əiʎtʲ/
oi	elsewhere		/ɤ/ /ɔ/	goid /kɤtʲ/, doirbh /ˈt̪ɤɾʲɤv/, coileach /ˈkʰɤləx/ toil /t̪ʰɔl/, coire /ˈkʰɔɾʲə/
oi	See below for ⟨oibh, oigh, oimh⟩ when they precede consonants			
ò, òi			/oː/ /ɔː/	bò /poː/, còig /kʰoːkʲ/ òir /ɔːɾʲ/, bòid /pɔːtʲ/
u	before ⟨ll, m, nn⟩ + consonant or word finally before ⟨rr, rn⟩		/uː/	cum /kʰuːm/, sunndach /ˈs̪uːn̪ˠt̪əx/, murn /muːɾn/
u	elsewhere		/u/	dubh /t̪u/, cumail /ˈkʰumal/
ua, uai	before ⟨m, n, ng⟩		/ua/	cuan /ˈkʰuan/, uaine /ˈuaɲə/
ua, uai	elsewhere		/uə/	tuagh /t̪ʰuəɣ/, duais /t̪uəʃ/
ui	before ⟨m, n, ng, s⟩		/ɯ/	uisge /ˈɯʃkʲə/, duine /ˈt̪ɯɲə/
ui	before ⟨dh⟩		/ɯi/	buidhe /ˈpɯi.ə/, suidhe /ˈs̪ɯi.ə/
ui	before ⟨ll, m, nn⟩ + consonant or word finally		/ɯi/	druim /ˈt̪ɾɯim/, muinntir /ˈmɯiɲtʲɪɾʲ/
ui	before ⟨ll, m, nn⟩ + vowel		/ɯ/	cluinneadh /ˈkl̪ˠɯɲəɣ/, tuilleadh /ˈt̪ʰɯʎəɣ/
ui	elsewhere		/u/	cuir /kʰuɾʲ/, tuit /t̪ʰuʰtʲ/
ui	See below for ⟨uimh⟩ when it precedes consonants			
ù, ùi			/uː/	sùil /s̪uːl/, cùis /kʰuːʃ/

== Vowel-consonant combinations ==
⟨bh, dh, gh, mh⟩ are commonly pronounced as vowels or are deleted if they are followed by a consonant. For example, in cabhag the ⟨bh⟩ is usually /v/ but in cabhlach the ⟨bh⟩ has turned into an /u/ vowel, yielding /au/ rather than /av/ in the first syllable.

Letters	Phoneme(s)	Examples
abh, amh	/au/	cabhlach /ˈkʰaul̪ˠəx/, samhradh /ˈs̪auɾəɣ/
adh, agh	/ɤː/	adhbran /ˈɤːpɾan/, ladhran /ˈl̪ˠɤːɾan/
aidh	/ai/	snaidhm /ˈs̪n̪ˠaim/
aigh	/ɤi/	saighdear /ˈs̪ɤitʲəɾ/, maighdean /ˈmɤitʲən/
eagh	/ɤː/	do theaghlach /t̪ə ˈhjɤːl̪ˠəx/
eamh	/ɛu/	geamhradh /ˈkʲɛuɾəɣ/, leamhrag /ˈʎɛuɾak/
iodh, iogh	/iə/	tìodhlaic /ˈtʰʲiəl̪ˠɪʰkʲ/, ioghnadh /ˈiənəɣ/
ogh	/oː/	foghnaidh /ˈfoːnɪ/, roghnaich /ˈrˠoːnɪç/
oibh	/ɤi/	goibhle /ˈkɤilə/, goibhnean /ˈkɤinən/
oigh	/ɤi/	oighre /ˈɤiɾʲə/, sloighre /ˈs̪l̪ˠɤiɾʲə/
oimh	/ɔi/	doimhne /ˈt̪ɔiɲə/, doimhneachd /ˈt̪ɔiɲəxk/
uimh	/ui/	cuimhne /ˈkʰuiɲə/, cuimhneachadh /ˈkʰuiɲəxəɣ/

== Epenthetic vowels ==
Where an ⟨l, n, r⟩ is followed (or in the case of ⟨m⟩, preceded) by a ⟨b, bh, ch, g, gh, m, mh⟩, an epenthetic vowel is inserted between the two. This is usually a copy of the vowel that preceded the ⟨l, n, r⟩. Examples; Alba /ˈal̪ˠapə/, marbh /ˈmaɾav/, tilg /ˈtʰʲilikʲ/, arm /ˈaɾam/, iomradh /ˈimiɾəɣ/.

If this process would lead to the sound sequence /ɛɾɛ/, the epenthetic vowel is an /a/ in many dialects, e.g dearg /ˈtʲɛɾak/.

== Defunct combinations ==
The acute accent is no longer used in standard Scottish Gaelic orthography, although it may be encountered in late 20th century writings, and occasionally in contemporary writings, especially in Canadian Gaelic.

Letter(s)	Phoneme(s)	Examples
á	/a/	ás /as/
é, éi	/eː/	Dùn Éideann /dun ˈeːtʲən̪ˠ/, éirigh /eːɾʲɪ/
ó, ói	/oː/	bó /poː/, cóig /kʰoːkʲ/, mór /moːɾ/

Certain spellings have also been regularised where they violate pronunciation rules. "Tigh" in particular can still be encountered in house names and certain place names, notably Tighnabruaich and Eilean Tigh.

- So → Seo
- Sud → Siud
- Tigh → Taigh

== Sources ==
- Bauer, Michael (2011). Blas Na Gàidhlig: The Practical Guide to Scottish Gaelic Pronunciation. Akerbeltz. ISBN 978-1-907165-00-9.
