= Inverarish =

Coordinates: 57.345851°N 6.0656604°W

Inverarish: Scottish Gaelic: Inbhir Àrais
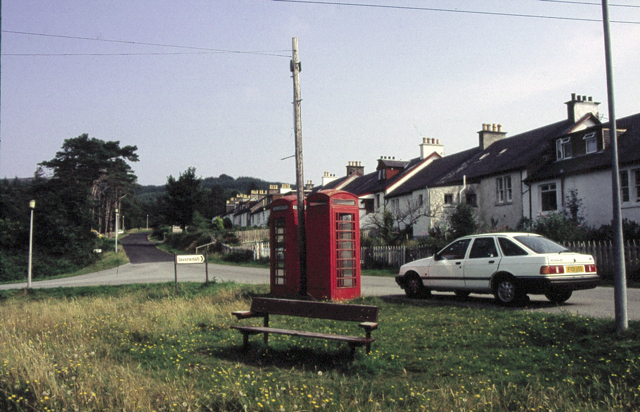

- Location within the Highland council area
- Civil parish: Portree
- Council area: Highland
- Country: Scotland
- Sovereign state: United Kingdom
- Post town: KYLE
- Postcode district: IV40
- Police: Scotland
- Fire: Scottish
- Ambulance: Scottish

Inverarish (Scottish Gaelic: Inbhir Àrais) is a village that is the main settlement of the Isle of Raasay, in the civil parish of Portree, in the council area of Highland, Scotland. It is 0.5 miles (0.80 km) southeast of the ferry pier at Clachan. In 1961 it had a population of 100.

== History ==
The name "Inverarish" is Gaelic/Norse and means "River mouth", the name contains both the Gaelic and Norse elements for the same feature. The village was established in 1912 for iron ore miners. It contains the remains of Baird & Co's ore trans-shipment station and the village was partly built by the company.

== Landmarks ==
Inverarish has two churches, a community hall called Raasay Community Hall, a fire station, a museum called Raasay Heritage Trust museum, a post office, a primary school called Raasay Primary School and a shop called Raasay Community Stores.
