= Calum MacLeod (of Raasay) =

Scottish crofter (1911–1988)

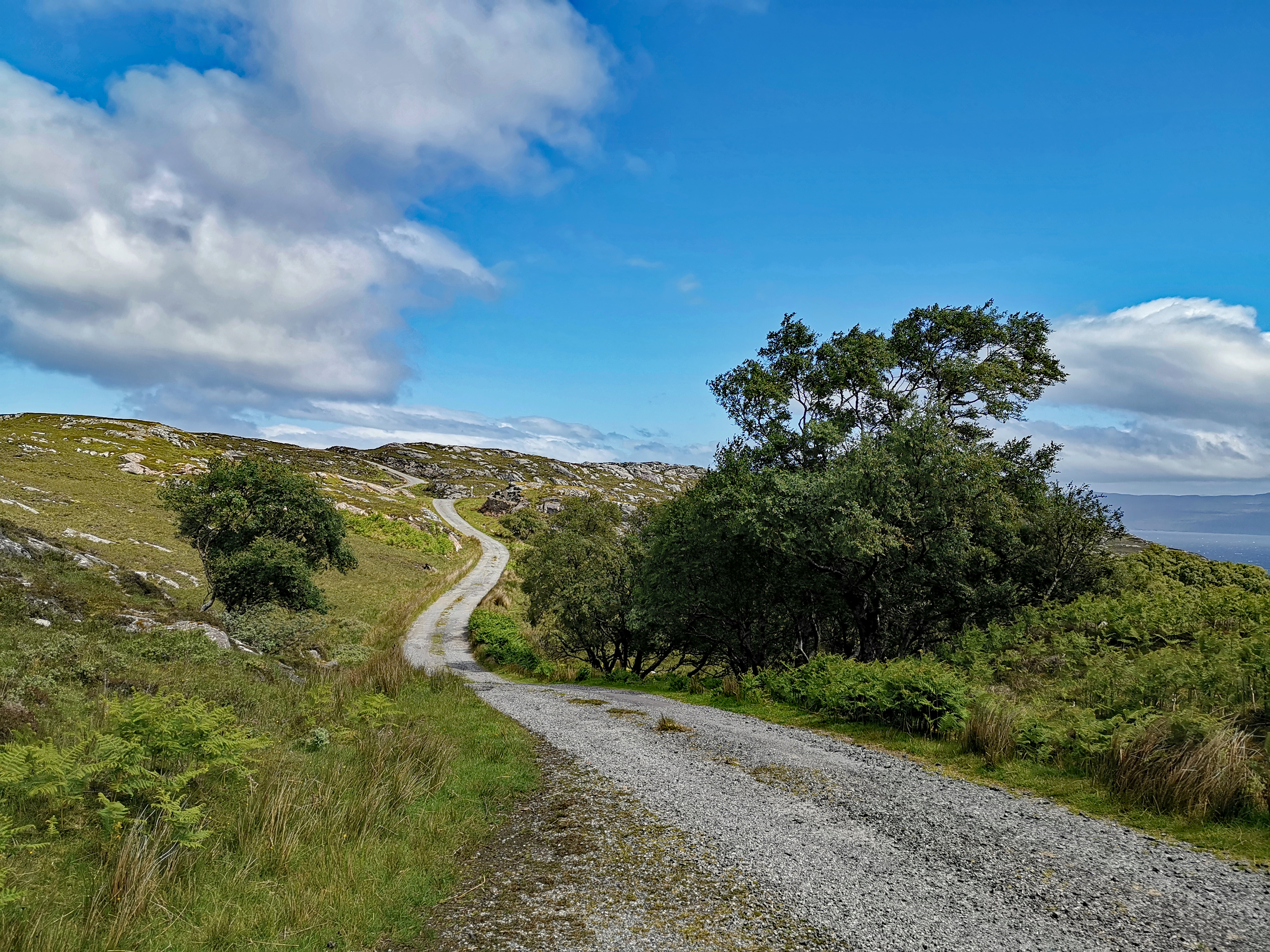
Calum's Road as it is today

Plaque on Calum's Cairn

Malcolm Macleod BEM (Scottish Gaelic: Calum Macleòid, 15 November 1911 – 26 January 1988) was a Scottish crofter who notably built Calum's Road on the Island of Raasay, Scotland. He was Local Assistant Keeper of Rona Lighthouse and the part-time postman for the north end of Raasay.

== Early life ==
Calum was the son of Donald Macleod of Arnish Raasay and Julia Gillies of Fladda. He was born in Glasgow as his father was working in the merchant navy. With the outbreak of World War I, Calum and his mother moved to the croft and house adjacent to that of his grandfather, in northern Raasay. Calum had two brothers, Ronald and Charles, and three sisters, Bella Dolly (died in the 1919 Spanish flu pandemic), Katie and Bella.

Calum attended Torran school, with its single teacher, James Mackinnon (Seumas Ruadh). He married Alexandrina (Lexie) Macdonald (1911–2001).

== Road building ==
Calum and his brother, Charles, constructed the track from Torran to Fladda (Eilean Fladday), over three winters from 1949 to 1952. For this, they were each paid £35 a year by the local council.

=== Calum's Road ===
After decades of unsuccessful campaigning by the inhabitants of the north end of Raasay for a road, and several failed grant applications, Calum decided to build the road himself. Purchasing Thomas Aitken's manual Road Making & Maintenance: A Practical Treatise for Engineers, Surveyors and Others (London, 1900), for half a crown, he started work, replacing the old narrow footpath. Over a period of about ten years (1964–1974), he constructed 1 3/4 miles (2.8 kilometres) of road between Brochel Castle and Arnish, using little more than a shovel, a pick and a wheelbarrow. Initial blasting work was carried out and funded, to the sum of £1,900, by the Department of Agriculture's Engineering Department, who supplied a compressor, explosives, driller, blaster, and men.

Several years after its completion, the road was finally adopted and surfaced by the local council. By then, Calum and his wife, Lexie, were the last inhabitants of Arnish. Today it is commonly referred to as Calum's Road.

== Recognition ==
Calum was awarded the British Empire Medal "for maintaining supplies to the Rona light". The citation could not say for constructing a road which had been the subject of conflict with the authorities for twenty years.

Calum's Road has been commemorated in music by Capercaillie on their 1988 album The Blood is Strong and in a book by Roger Hutchinson. A major film was also planned with the rights to the book having been bought by HandMade Films with the intention of producing the film in partnership with UK Made Films and with a screenplay written by the Scottish writer Colin MacDonald. These plans however have not come to fruition.

A cairn beside his road near Brochel Castle commemorates Calum's achievements. It is inscribed in Gaelic and then English. This cairn was built by Donald John Graham of Portree, Skye.

A song on Scottish band Runrig's eleventh studio album The Stamping Ground, entitled "Wall of China/One Man" was inspired by Calum's story.

A play Calum's Road was adapted by David Harrower from Roger Hutchinson's book. Produced by the National Theatre of Scotland and Communicado Theatre Company, directed by Gerry Mulgrew, it toured Scotland in Autumn 2011 and in the Summer of 2013. Calum's Road, a radio play written by Colin MacDonald and starring Ian McDiarmid, was broadcast on BBC Radio 4 in October 2013. Gillian Reynolds, in the Daily Telegraph, described it as "a story to inspire".

A dance "Calum's Road" was choreographed by British circle dancer Cindy Kelly, and it is regularly done by circle dance groups worldwide.

== Gaelic writer ==
As well as being a road-builder, Macleod was a writer. A zealous and tireless correspondent with local authorities and newspapers, he was also a local historian of some distinction. Some, but by no means all, of his writings were published during his lifetime as articles in the Gaelic periodical Gairm, while others have been posthumously collected, translated, and edited by his daughter Julia Macleod Allan as Fàsachadh An-Iochdmhor Ratharsair: The Cruel Clearance of Raasay (Clò Àrnais, 2007).

=== Published writings ===
- 'An Gàidheal gaisgeil', Gairm, 111–12 (Summer/Autumn, 1980), 223–42; 113 (Winter, 1980–1), 65–78. [biographical anecdotes concerning Captain Donald McRae (1893–1963), Sydney Harbourmaster 1951-6]
- 'Màiri Mhòr nan Òran agus an ceannaiche', Gairm, 114 (Spring, 1981), 122–3.
- 'Tha mise ag iarraidh liùgh no bodach-ruadh anns am bi triubhas', Gairm, 115 (Summer, 1981), 219–20.
- 'Turas a' bhotail uisge-bheatha', Gairm, 121 (Winter, 1982–3), 61–5.
- 'Bi aoigheil ri luchd-turais: Ach leugh seo!', Gairm, 122 (Spring, 1983), 174–8.
- 'An tuagh-cloiche', Gairm, 125 (Winter, 1983–4), 38–9.
- 'Dà sheann uidheam: An criathar agus an cliabh-gaoithe', Gairm, 126 (Spring, 1984), 132–3.
- 'A' chas-chrom', Gairm, 127 (Summer, 1984), 223–7.
- 'A’ chreathail Ghàidhealach', Gairm, 129 (Winter, 1984–5), 52–4.
- 'An caibe-làir', Gairm, 131 (Summer, 1985), 223–4.
- 'Turas Dhòmhnaill Bhàin air a’ Mhetagama', Gairm, 133 (Winter, 1985–6), 67–78.
- 'Turas Dhòmhnaill Bhàin gu Iodhlainn Alba (Scotland Yard)', Gairm, 127 (Winter, 1986–7), 57–63.
- 'Dòigh air leigheas at-amhaich', Gairm, 141 (Spring, 1988), 170.
- (ed. Julia Macleod Allan), Fàsachadh An-Iochdmhor Ratharsair: The Cruel Clearance of Raasay (Clò Àrnais, 2007).
