= South Rona =

Island in the Inner Hebrides, Scotland

Rona
Rònaigh (Gaelic)
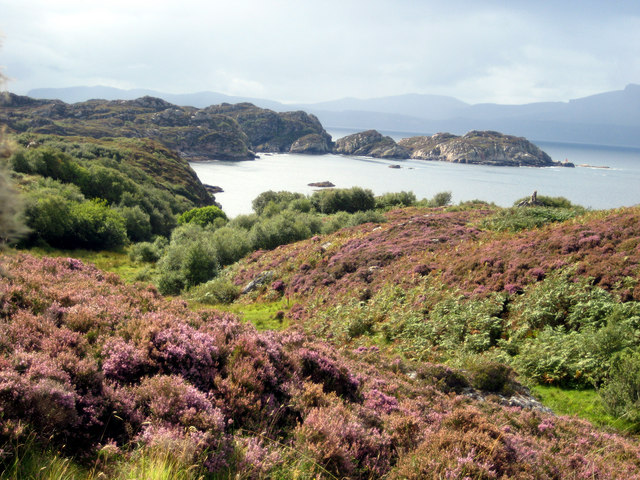
- A view towards Dry Harbour

Location
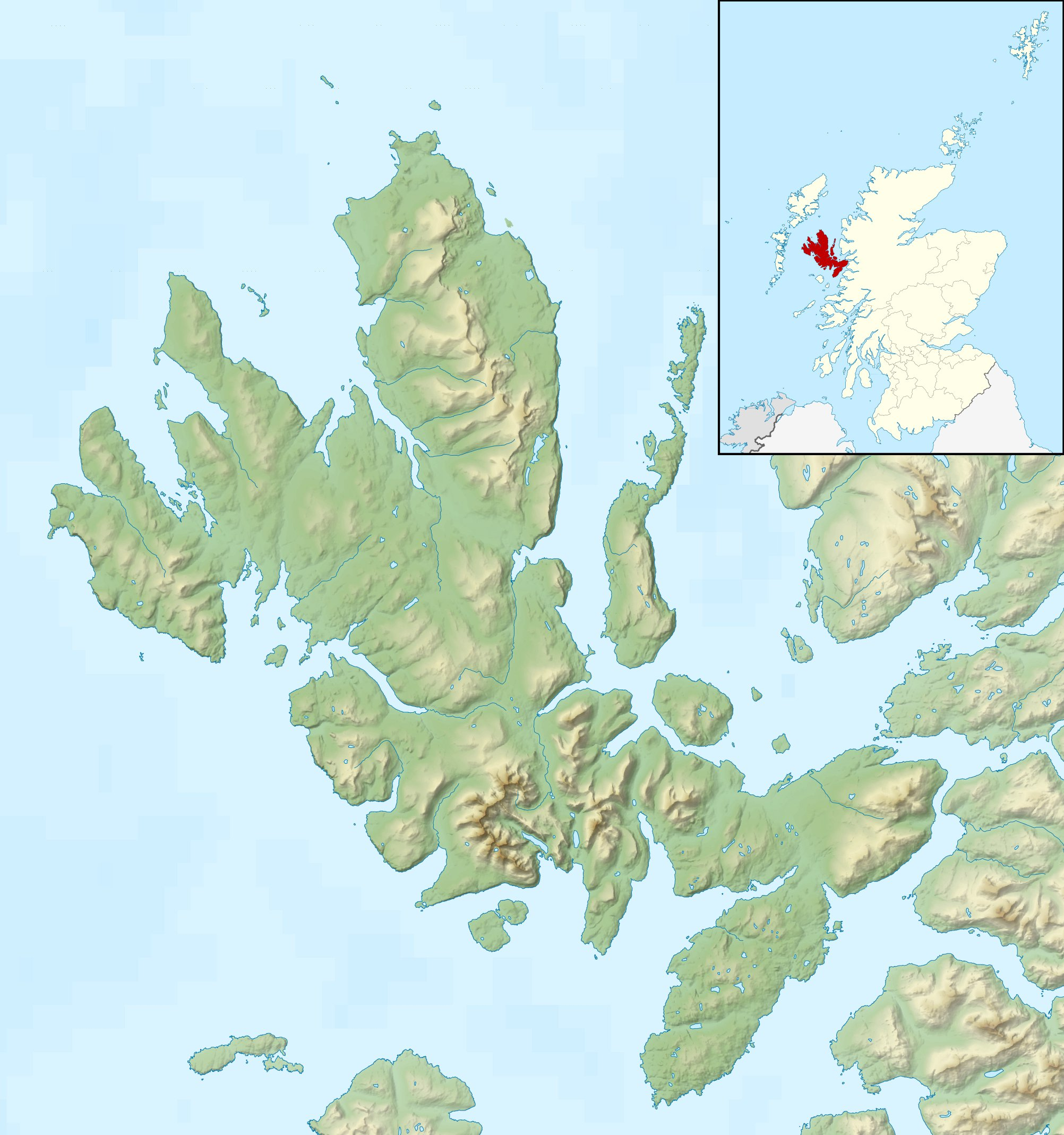
- Location within Isle of Skye
- OS grid reference: NG619563
- Coordinates: 57.54°N 5.978°W

Name
- Gaelic pronunciation: [ˈrˠɔːnaj]
- Name meaning: Norse for "rough islands"
- Old Norse name: Hraun eyer

Physical geography
- Island group: Skye
- Area: 930 hectares (3.6 sq mi)
- Area rank: 52
- Highest elevation: Meall na h-Acarsaid 125 metres (410 ft)

Administration
- Council area: Highland
- Country: Scotland
- Sovereign state: United Kingdom

Demographics
- Population: 2
- Population rank: 88=
- Population density: 0.22 people/km^{2}
- Largest settlement: An Acarsaid Mhòr

Rona (Scottish Gaelic: Rònaigh), sometimes called South Rona to distinguish it from North Rona (a small uninhabited island to the northwest of Cape Wrath), is an uninhabited island in the Inner Hebrides. It lies between the Sound of Raasay and the Inner Sound just north of the neighbouring island of Raasay and east of the Trotternish peninsula of Skye. It has a total area of 930 hectares (3.6 sq mi) and has a population of 1. The island is owned by hedge fund manager Danny Luhde-Thompson and his wife, Cressida Pollock.

Rona Lighthouse is situated on the island.

== Geography and geology ==
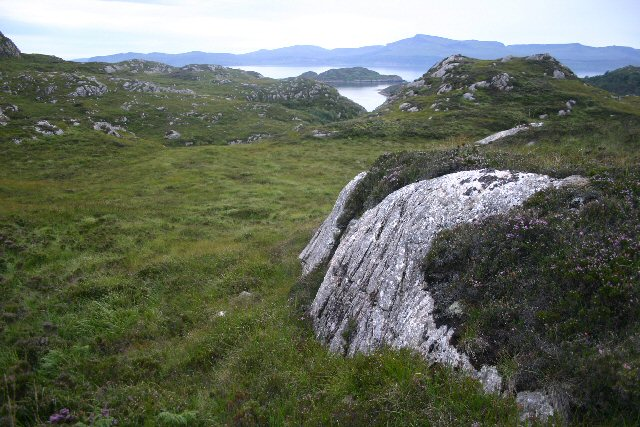
An outcrop of gneiss on Rona

Rona is an extension northward of the ridge of Raasay. Its geology is Lewisian gneiss and the glaciated landscape is underlain by some of the oldest rocks in western Europe.

Writing in the early 18th century, Martin Martin recorded that "this little isle is the most unequal rocky piece of ground to be seen anywhere: there is but very few acres fit for digging, the whole is covered with long heath, erica-baccifera, mertillus, and some mixture of grass; it is reckoned very fruitful in pasturage: most of the rocks consist of the hectic stone, and a considerable part of them is of a red colour."

On the west side of the island is a secure and picturesque natural anchorage, An Acarsaid Mhòr, protected by the small island of An t-Eilean Garbh. The writer Malcolm Slesser described it as "a delightful little fjord, and superb harbour for small boats. Pink felspar cliffs drop steeply into the water, and small lush woodland lends a touch of luxury."

Other islets surrounding Rona include Eilean Seamraig, Garbh Eilean (connected to Rona at low tide), Sgeirean Buidhe Bhorlum, and A' Sgeir Shuas. Eilean Tighe (connected to Raasay at low tide) lies about 1 kilometre (0.62 mi) away across the straits of An Caol Ronaigh, at the centre of which is tiny Fraoich Eilean. The east coast is largely unindented and in addition to Acairseid Mhór the main bays are An Dubh-Chamus (black bay), An Acarsaid Thioram (dry harbour) and Loch a' Bhràigheig on the west coast. There are several smaller bays in the north west including Port an Fhearainn (port of the land), Òb nam Feusgan (bay of the mussel), Port na Bà Brice (port of the speckled cow) and Òb an Deallaire (bay of the loiterer). The highest point on the island is Meall na h-Acarseid, which reaches 125 metres (410 ft). Sgàth a' Bhannaich and Beinn na h-Iolaire (hill of the eagle) are further north and are each over 100 metres (330 ft) high.

== Name ==
Rona's name is believed to be of Old Norse origin, from Hraun-eyer meaning "rough islands" and probably reflects a Viking settlement. The Gaelic name Rònaigh has a similar meaning.

== History ==
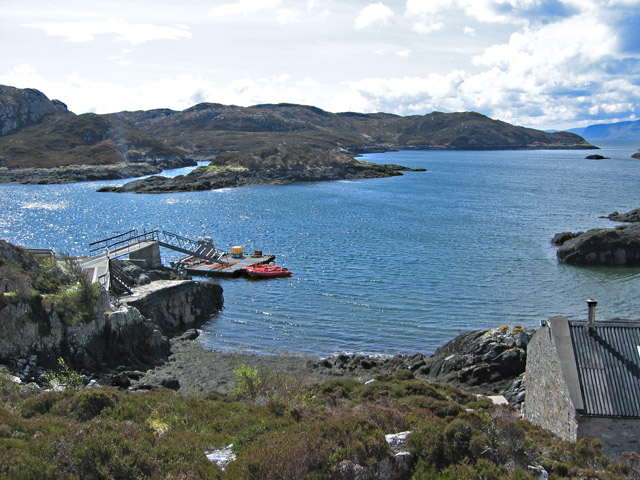
The pontoon at Acairseid Mhor.

=== Prehistory ===
Between 1999 and 2004 a large scale archaeological project, Scotland's First Settlers, was undertaken in the Inner Sound to locate and examine sites relating to the Mesolithic period in the strait. The entire coastline of the Inner Sound together with its islands was walked by volunteers and archaeologists. On Rona they found four caves and rock shelters with evidence of prehistoric habitation. The archaeologists interpreted this to mean that Rona was not as intensively occupied as other parts of the Inner Sound. An aspect they attribute to the lack of fresh water on the island, relative infertility of the landscape and difficulty in accessing the island as there are only two safe landing spots, Big Harbour and Dry Harbour.

=== Early historic period ===
There are the ruins of a small 14th century chapel at the south end of the island at An Teampull. The structure, probably a monk's cell, is enclosed by a wall within which is the island's only gravestone. In the 16th century Rona became a refuge for pirates who made a base at An Acarsaid Mhor, then known as Port nan Robairean - "port of the robbers". Murray (1973) presumes that they confined their attacks to foreign vessels as they seem to have been tolerated by the local clan chiefs. One such pirate chief is said to have been Calum Garbh MacLeod, son of a chief of Clan Macleod of Lewis who based himself at Brochail Castle on Raasay in 1518 and used Rona as raiding base.

Writing in 1549, Dean Monro stated: "At the north end of Raarsay, be half myle of sea frae it, layes ane ile callit Ronay, mair then a myle in lengthe, full of wood and heddir, with ane havin for heiland galeys in the middis of it, and the same havein is guyed for fostering of theives, ruggairs, and reivairs, till a nail, upon the peilling and spulzeing of poure pepill. This ile perteins to M.’ Gillychallan of Raarsay by force, and to the bishope of the iles be heritage".

=== Modern era ===
Clan MacLeod held the island until the middle of the 19th century. In 1763 the Laird of Raasay is recorded as having kept a cowhand and 160 cattle on the island and in 1787 MacLeod of Raasay explored the opportunities for commercial fishing on the island. He wrote to the Duke of Argyll, then Governor of the British Fisheries Society stating that Rona was:

...one of the most advantageous places on this coast for a fishing station. It is surrounded with numbers of banks which are daily discovered by the country people who come to fish from the mainland, which makes me think there is an inexhaustible fund of them about the island. It is likewise supplied with the best harbours at every creek, both for large vessels and small boats.

However his support for the Jacobite cause worked against him and nothing was done. In 1843 Rona and Raasay were sold to George Rainy who began clearing the native population of the latter to make way for sheep.

Year	1841	1851	1861	1881	1891	1922	1931	1971	1981	1991	2001	2011	2022
Population	165	115	147	176	181	14 families	16	3	3	0	2	3	2

After the first phase of clearances the population of Rona rose steadily to over 180, the main settlements being at Doire na Guaileadhin the south, An Acarsaid Mhór and An Acarsaid Thioram. Many of the residents were crofting families who had themselves been cleared from more fertile land on Raasay. In May 1921, a group of crofters from Rona landed on Raasay and attempted to re-occupy their ancestral land. These so-called "Raasay Raiders" were arrested, tried and given jail sentences, but public support for them was strong and they were eventually freed and allowed to remain on Raasay. This led in 1922 to the acquisition of both Rona and Raasay from their private landlord by the British Government. After this, the population of Rona fell sharply, as most of the island's inhabitants followed the Raiders to settle on Raasay. In 1943 the last crofting family left and the island had become uninhabited, with the exception of the lighthouse keepers who lived at its north end until the lighthouse was automated in 1975.

On the east side of the island is a cave that was used for Sunday worship until the church was built in 1912. It continued to be used sporadically until 1970. The Gaelic name of the cave is "Uamha an Fhuaimhar"; this translates to "cave of the giant". Thomas C Lethbridge gives a good description of the cave as it appeared in 1950, still with its stone seats and with the altar at the mouth of the cave. Archaeologists conducted a small test pit excavation in the early 2000s and found evidence of occupation of the cave from at least the Iron Age onwards.

In 1992 Rona was acquired from the government by a Danish owner, who restored Rona Lodge at An Acarsaid Mhór and built a new landing jetty. Rona currently has one permanent resident, the island manager, who lives at Rona Lodge and also manages the self-catering cottages at An Acarsaid Thioram. Transport to the island is by private charter from Portree. 57.5 hectares (142 acres) at the north end of the island remain in the hands of the Ministry of Defence and are part of the BUTEC military range.

== Stamps ==
Local stamps have been issued for Rona since 2003. The stamps are for visitors to the island who wish to have their mail posted there and carried to the nearest GPO post box on the mainland.

== Wildlife ==
Writing in the 1960s, Fraser Darling and Boyd recorded a herd of feral goats on the island and an absence of mice and voles. The goats have now gone but red deer were introduced to the island in 1993 and a fold of Highland cattle from North Uist followed in 1996. Over 300 species of plant have been recorded and in the absence of sheep the native woodland is regenerating.
