= Raasay =

Island in Highland, Scotland

Ratharsair (Gaelic)
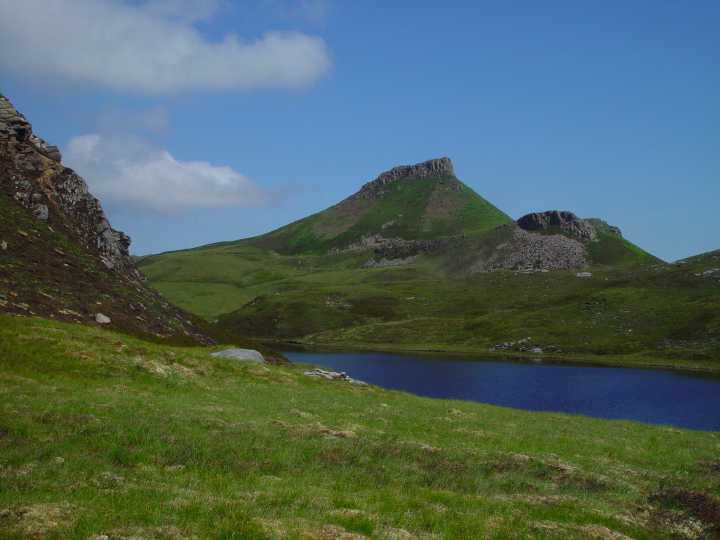
- Dùn Caan from Loch na Mna

Location
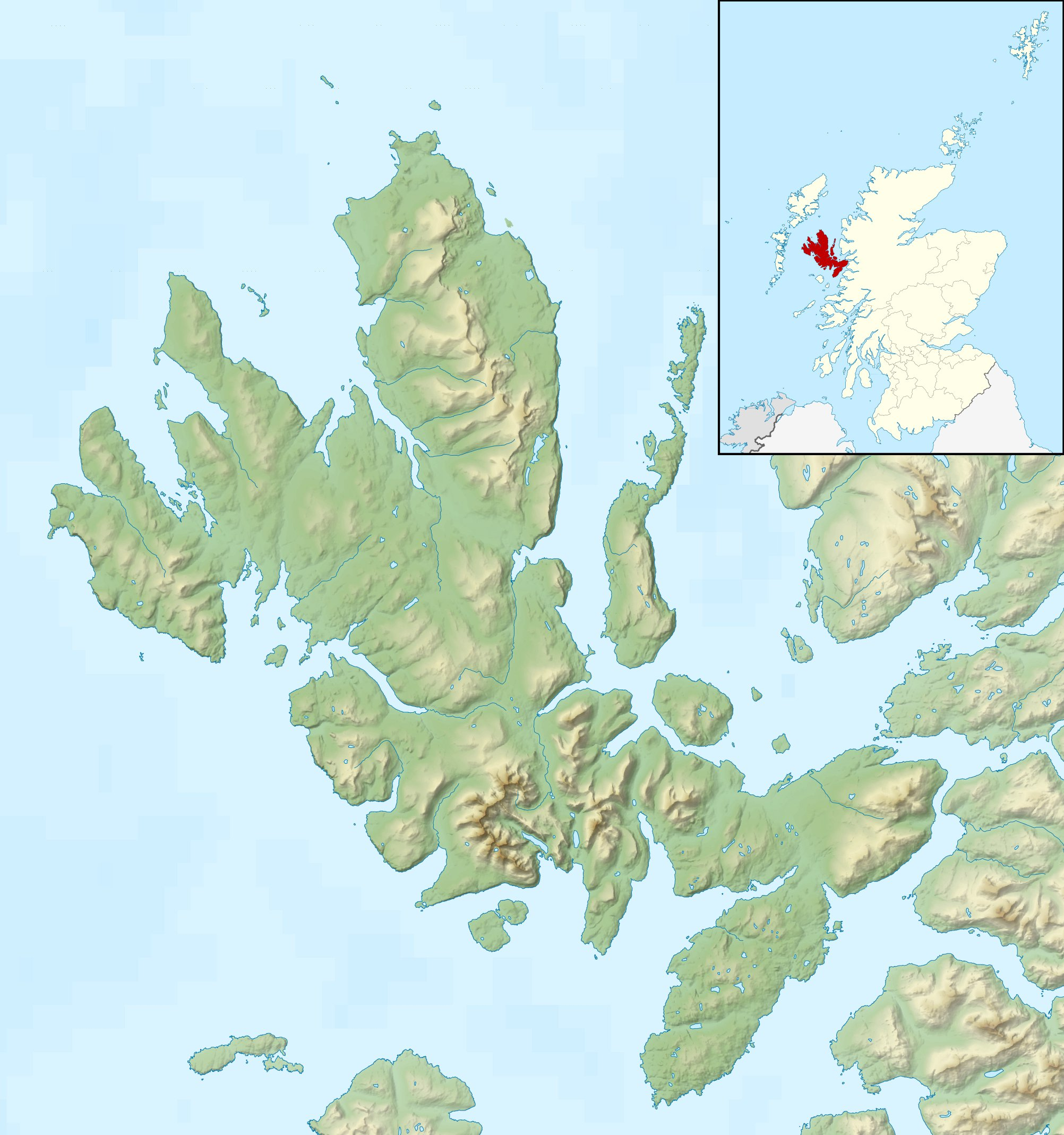
- Raasay shown within the Skye area
- OS grid reference: NG579395
- Coordinates: 57°24′N 6°02′W

Name
- Gaelic pronunciation: [ˈrˠa.arˠs̪əɾʲ]
- Name meaning: Old Norse for "roe deer island" or possibly "horse island"
- Old Norse name: Raa-s-oy or Ross-oy, Rásey or Hrossey

Physical geography
- Island group: Skye
- Area: 6,231 ha (24 sq mi)
- Area rank: 19
- Highest elevation: Dùn Caan 444 m (1,457 ft)

Administration
- Council area: Highland
- Country: Scotland
- Sovereign state: United Kingdom

Demographics
- Population: 187
- Population rank: 33=
- Population density: 2.9/km^{2} (7.5/sq mi)
- Largest settlement: Inverarish

Raasay (/ˈrɑːseɪ/; Scottish Gaelic: Ratharsair), sometimes the Isle of Raasay, is an island between the Isle of Skye and the mainland of Scotland. It is separated from Skye by the Sound of Raasay and from Applecross by the Inner Sound. It is famous for being the birthplace of Gaelic poet Sorley MacLean, an important figure in the Scottish Renaissance.

Traditionally the home of Clan MacSween, the island was ruled by the MacLeods from the 15th to the 19th century. Subsequently, a series of private landlords held title to the island, which is now largely in public ownership. Raasay House, which was visited by James Boswell and Samuel Johnson in 1773, is now a hotel, restaurant, bar and outdoor activity centre. Raasay means "Isle of the Roe Deer" and the island is home to an endemic subspecies of bank vole.

== Geology and geography ==
About 14 miles (23 kilometres) north to south and 3 miles (5 kilometres) east to west (at its widest), Raasay's terrain is varied. The highest point, at 443 metres (1,453 feet), is Dùn Caan – an unusual, flat-topped peak. The island of Rona lies just off the north coast and the tidal islets of Eilean Fladday and Eilean Tigh are to the northwest. Other smaller surrounding islands are Eilean Aird nan Gobhar, Eilean an Inbhire, Holoman Island, Manish Island, Fraoch Eilean, Glas Eilean, Griana-sgeir and Eilean an Fhraoich. The main village of Inverarish is near the southwest coast and contiguous with both Clachan at the west end where the main pier is situated and Suishnish to the east. Oskaig is a small settlement further up the west coast.

Geologically interesting, the island is visited by many students engaged in mapping projects. The south is mainly Torridonian sandstone and shale; the north is grey-banded Archaean Lewisian gneiss and granulite. There are also smaller outcrops of Jurassic shales and sandstones occasionally interspersed with limestone. The related ironstone beds, which are of Toarcian age, contain low grade oolitic siderite and chamosite ores and were worked commercially in the early 20th century. Remaining reserves are estimated at 10 million tonnes. The seas to the east and west are very deep, large troughs having been created by the Skye icecap in the Pleistocene.

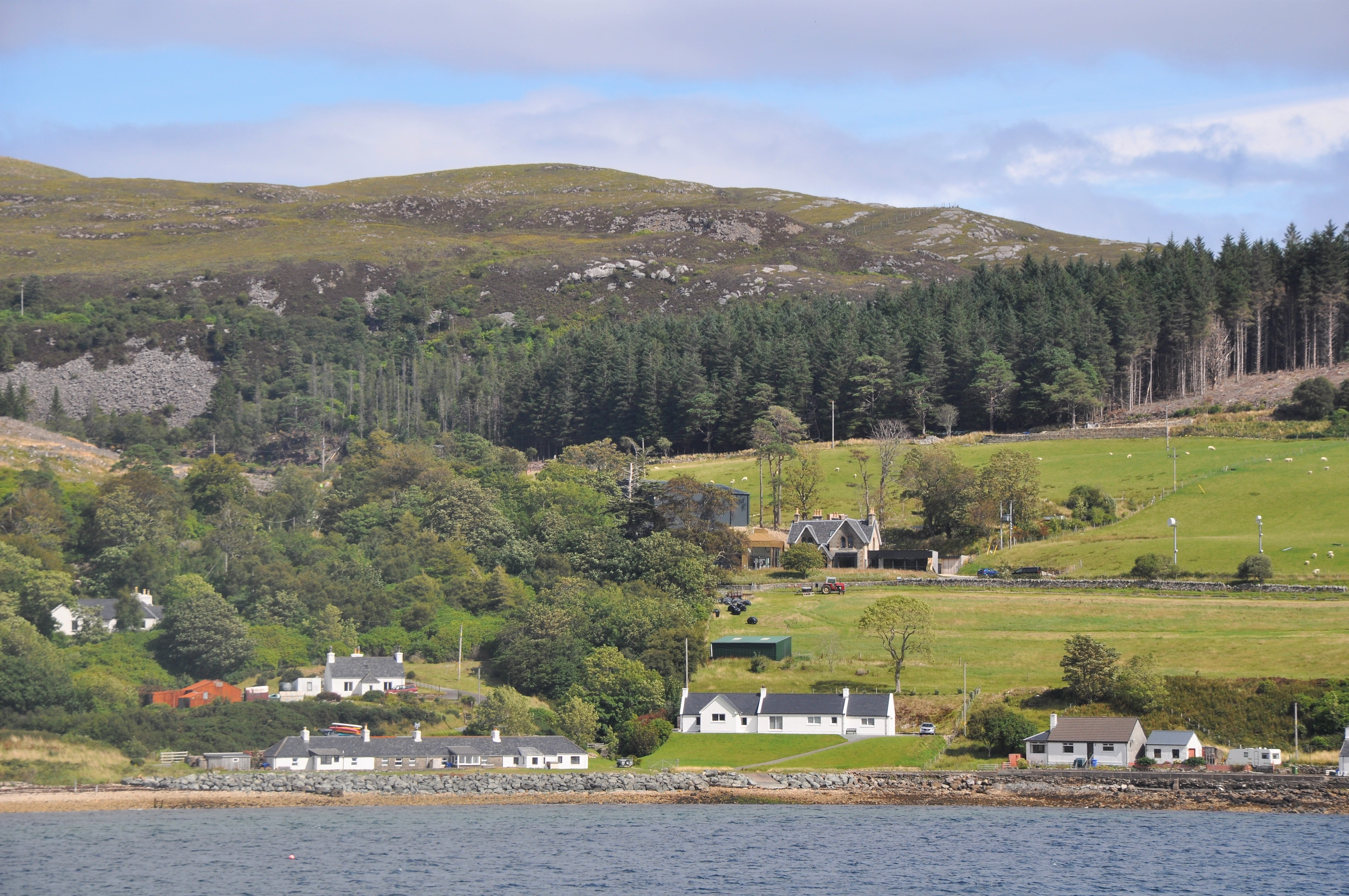
Clachan

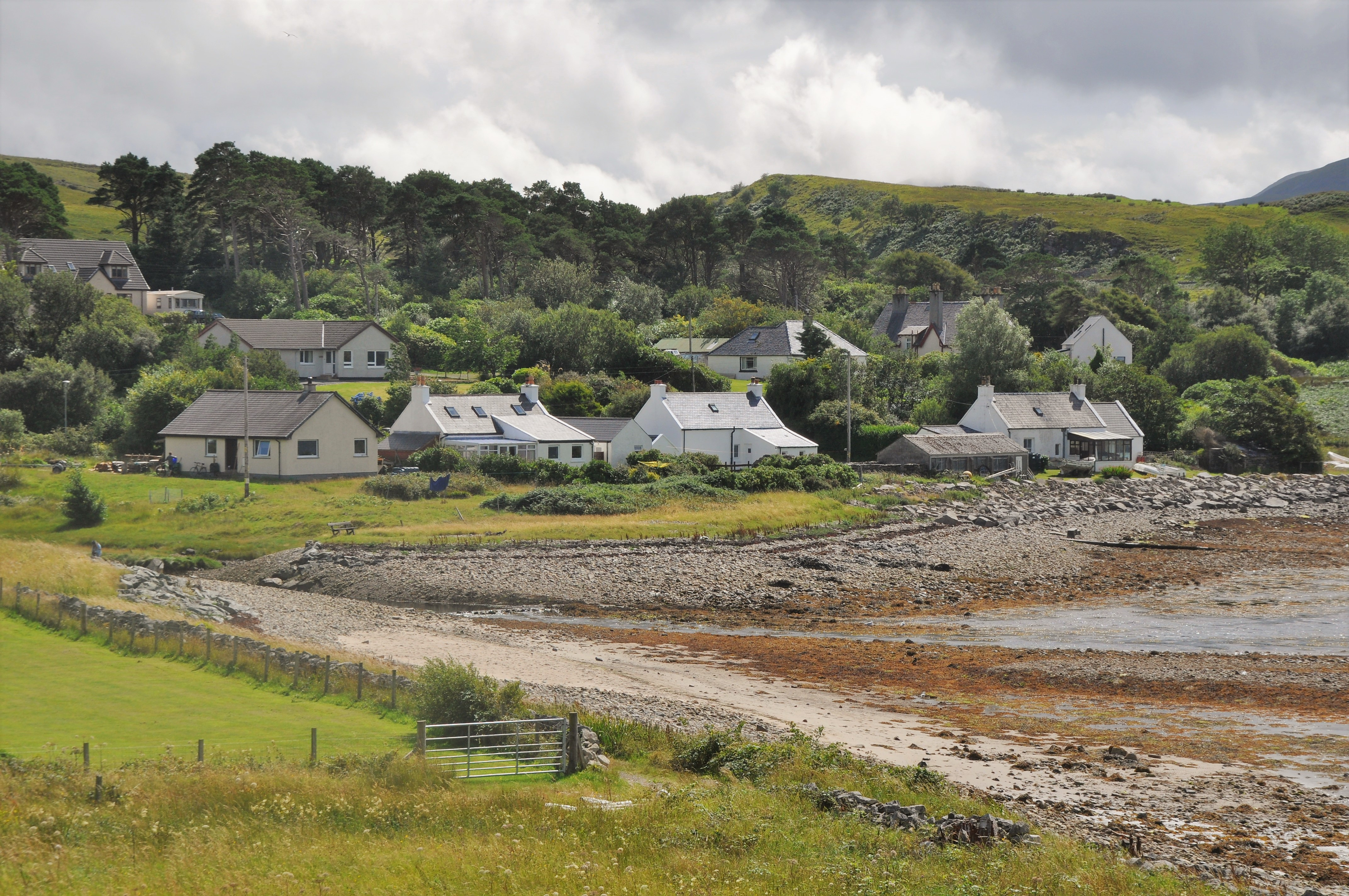
Suisnish

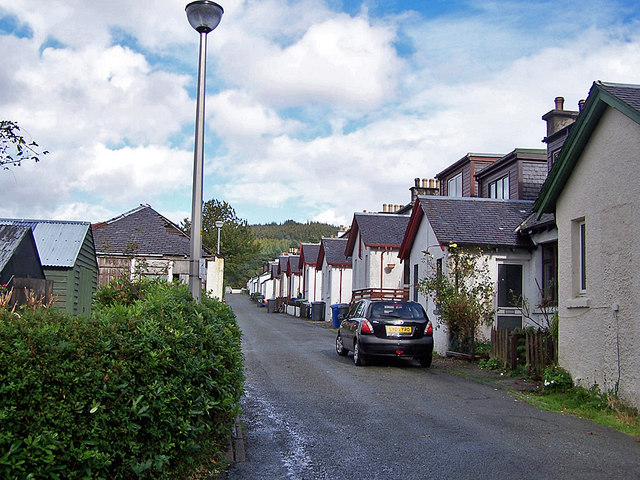
Inverarish

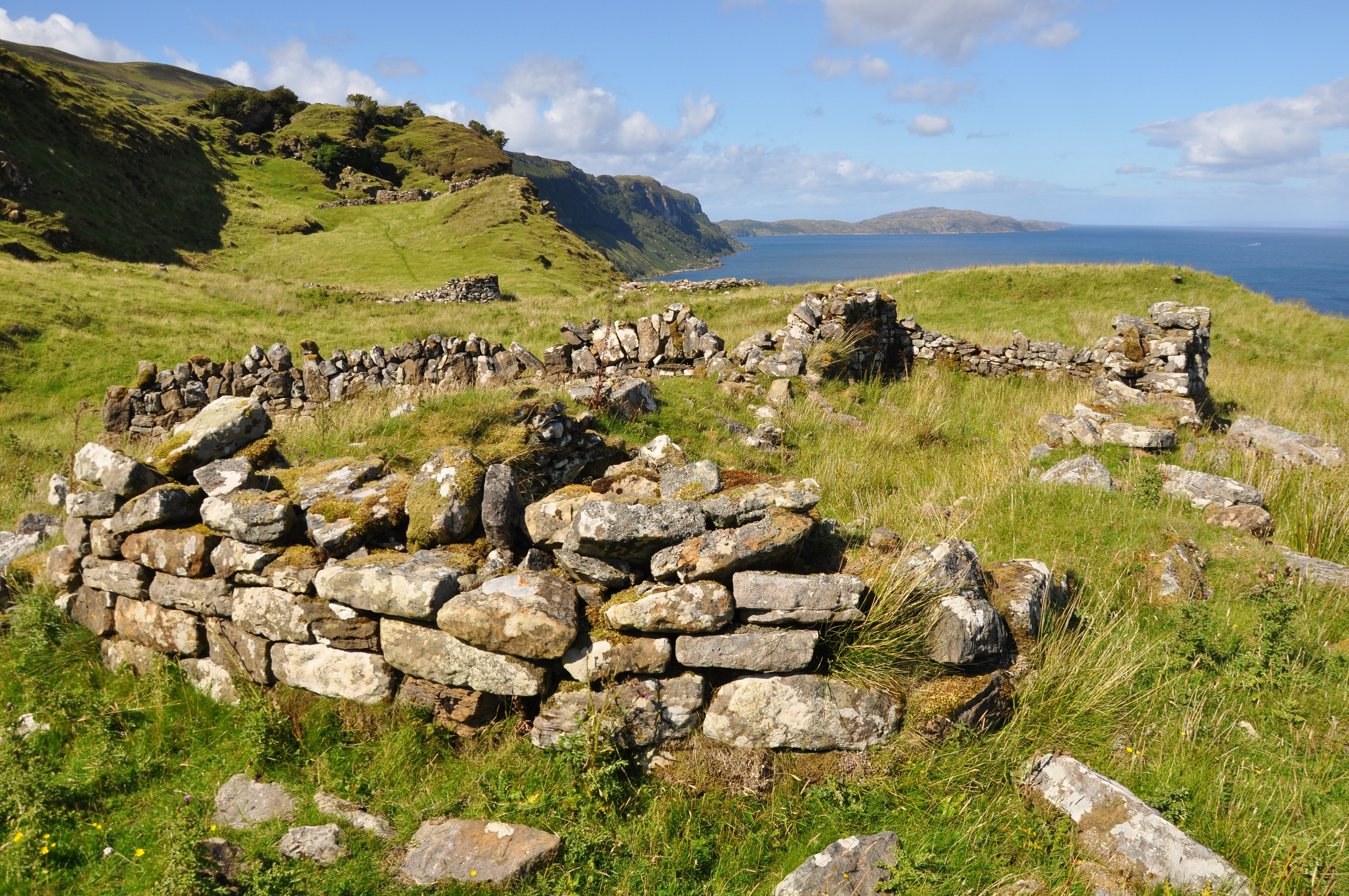
Hallaig (abandoned)

== Natural heritage ==
=== Flora ===
Raasay supports a rich variety of plants, including red broomrape, dark red helleborine, mountain avens and numerous other saxifrages, orchids, alpines and ferns. The carline thistle (Carlina vulgaris) was apparently extant in the 1970s, but a recent survey found no evidence of its continued existence. There are several stands of mixed woodland. (Note: For a comprehensive flora of the island see Bungard 2009)

Stands of mixed woodland, now categorised as Atlantic rainforest, cover 9% of the island. On the slopes below the limestone cliffs on the east coast are woods of hazel, birch, alder, willow, rowan and holly. In older woodland, trunks and branches are thickly clad in a wide range of epiphytic lichens, mosses and ferns. Rock whitebeam (Aria rupicola) is to be found at inaccessible locations on the cliffs. The woodland at Fearns in the south of the island includes aspen and a few oak trees.

Rhododendron ponticum, originally planted in the policies of Raasay House, has spread extensively on acid soils, covering over 360 ha., 6% of the island, by the early 2020s. In 2025, Carbon Neutral Islands (CNI) began a Habitat Restoration Project with the aim of eradicating the species.

=== Fauna ===
The island is home to the Raasay vole (Clethrionomys glareolus erica), a subspecies of bank vole, which is darker and heavier than the mainland variety and found nowhere else in the world. It is possibly a survivor of a Scandinavian race. It is one of only four islands of the Inner Hebrides where mountain hares breed. Raasay is regularly visited by white-tailed sea eagles and golden eagles and there are populations of otter, red deer and European rabbit (which were introduced by the island's proprietor in the 19th century). Stoat and weasel are found in small numbers as are water shrew.

Murray (1973) states that a single specimen of a pine marten, then otherwise missing from the Hebrides, was found on the island in 1971. (Note: Murray states "The pine marten, which has been absent from the Hebrides for a hundred years, reappeared on Raasay in 1971, when a single specimen was identified beyond doubt". He attributes this to a 1972 report in The Scotsman by Alison Lambie.) No other records for this species exist.

== Economy and culture ==
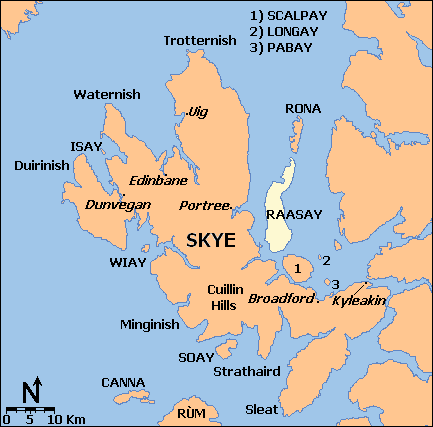
Map of Skye and Raasay

The primary employment is in tourism, working for the ferry company, crofting and fishing, or commuting to work on Skye. A twenty-five-minute ride by the car and passenger ferry connects the island with Sconser on Skye. There is a primary school, but older students go to Portree High School by the ferry and bus.

Sites of interest include the remains of a broch, the ruins of Brochel Castle, inscribed stones, abandoned crofting communities, and many walking paths.

There is a shop/post office located in Inverarish. Accommodation is available in the old manor of Raasay House, and at various B&Bs. There are significant numbers of incomers and holiday homes especially in the south of the island. This has helped to arrest the population decline from over 900 in 1803 to 194 in 2001. Some inhabitants belong to the Free Presbyterian Church of Scotland, which strictly observes the Sabbath. On Sundays there are no public services, the playground is closed and, until 2004, the ferry did not run.

In early 2007 the Raasay Community Association signed a contract with a number of building contractors to construct a community centre, which hosted its first céilidh on 29 May 2010. In 2008 construction began on a new £12 million ferry terminal at Churchton Bay, which was officially opened on 17 August 2010. Following the community buyout of Raasay House, a £3.5 million refurbishment was undertaken, leading to the temporary closure of the outdoor centre. However, in the early hours of 18 January 2009 the building was severely damaged by fire. Restoration work commenced in August 2010 but was suspended in November when the main contractor, ROK, went into administration. Work restarted with a new contractor, Mansell, in late 2011. Raasay House was officially handed over to the community in March 2013 and in addition to the 4 star accommodation it provides it is also now an outdoor activity centre with a restaurant, bar and cafe.

In September 2017 the Isle of Raasay distillery opened after the conversion of Borodale House. One source described this as transforming the "derelict Gothic hotel ... into a modern whisky distillery, visitor centre and accommodation". The company's Single malt Scotch was described by one source as the island's "first legal single malt" whisky. It released 7,500 bottles of the spirit in 2020, the first year that Raasay Single Malt became available.

In July 2026 it was announced that a disused ferry store would be converted into the island's first venison processing facility. The project will be funded by a grant of £129,000 from the Scottish Government Carbon Neutral Islands programme.

== Prehistory ==
Between 1999 and 2004 a large scale archaeological project, Scotland's First Settlers, was undertaken in the Inner Sound to locate and examine sites relating to the Mesolithic period in the strait. The entire coastline of the Inner Sound together with its islands was walked by volunteers and archaeologists. On Raasay they found 14 caves and rock shelters with evidence of prehistoric habitation, in the form of both middens and walls. Only the site at Loch an Sgurra at the far north of Raasay was confirmed as Mesolithic on the basis of both the stone tools and radiocarbon dating.

== History ==
The spread of Scots culture from Dalriada north of Ardnamurchan is poorly understood and little is recorded of Raasay's early Christian period. The placename Kilmaluag suggests the presence of St Moluag in the late sixth century.

Following Viking expeditions to the islands they called the Suðreyjar in the eighth century, Raasay became part of the Norse Kingdom of the Isles and for much of the period religious observance came under the jurisdiction of the Bishopric of the Isles. The Hebrides were yielded to the Kingdom of Scotland as a result of the 1266 Treaty of Perth, (Note: For the text of the treaty and a translation from the Latin to English see "Agreement between Magnus IV and Alexander III, 1266" Manx Society. IV, VII & IX. Retrieved 10 April 2016.) after which time control of the islands north of Ardnamurchan was in the hands of the Earls of Ross. In addition to the name "Raasay" itself, placenames such as Arnish (eagle headland), Suidhisnis (seething headland) and Eyre (beach or sand spit) are a legacy of the Norse presence.

=== 15th to 17th century ===
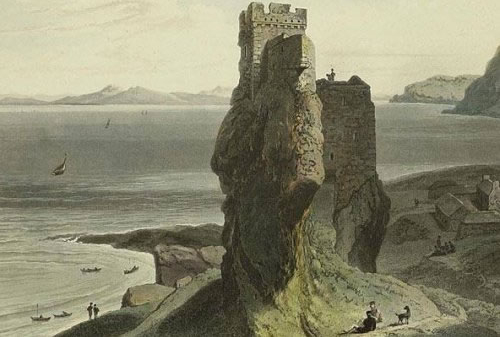
Castle Broichin on the Isle of Raasay, an 1819 aquatint by William Daniell depicting Brochel Castle

Tradition has it that Clan MacSween originally held title to Raasay but there is no written record of this. It is known that the island was ruled by the MacLeods from 1518 when Gillecallum, younger son of the MacLeod Chief of Lewis was granted title. Martin Martin visited towards the end of the 17th century and noted:

it has some wood on all the quarters of it, the whole is fitter for pasturage than cultivation, the ground being generally very unequal, but very well watered with rivulets and springs. There is a spring running down the face of a high rock on the east side of the isle; it petrifies into a white substance, of which very fine lime is made, and there is a great quantity of it. There is a quarry of good stone on the same side of the isle; there is abundance of caves on the west side, which serve to lodge several families, who for their convenience in grazing, fishing, &c., resort thither in the summer. On the west side, particularly near to the village Clachan, the shore abounds with smooth stones of different sizes, variegated all over. The same cattle, fowl, and fish are produced here that are found in the isle of Skye. There is a law observed by the natives that all their fishing lines must be of equal length, for the longest is always supposed to have best access to the fish, which would prove a disadvantage to such as might have shorter ones.

There are some forts in this isle, the highest is in the south end; it is a natural strength, and in form like the crown of a hat; it is called Dun-Cann, which the natives will needs have to be from one Canne, cousin to the king of Denmark. The other lies on the side, is an artificial fort, three stories high, and is called Castle Vreokle.

Brochel Castle, as it is more commonly known, was built by the MacSweens in the 15th century on the north-east coast of Raasay. Latterly, it became a base for the MacLeod of Lewis's pirating activities prior to Calum Garbh's investiture there. The castle was inhabited until the death by drowning of the Chief Iain Garbh in 1671 and is now a ruin sitting atop a pinnacle. In the meantime the Macleods moved their seat to Raasay House at the south end of the island.

=== 18th century ===
Although Protestant, the MacLeods of Raasay supported Bonnie Prince Charlie during and after the Jacobite rising of 1745. After the defeat at the Battle of Culloden, the Prince spent 2 days hiding from the British troops on Raasay. In conversation with Malcolm MacLeod of Raasay during his short stay on the island the Prince confided that although his life on the run was hard, he would rather live that way for ten years than be captured as he feared assassination. He seemed less aware of the risks his supporters ran. The atrocities perpetrated in the aftermath of Culloden were a shock to him. Of Cumberland he said: "Surely that man who calls himself a duke and pretends to be so great a general cannot be guilty of such cruelties. I cannot believe it."

According to a 20 October 1752 letter to Robert Forbes by the Laird of Raasay, as a consequence of the island's support for the Jacobite cause and for having granted hospitality to the prince, the island was subjected to scorched earth tactics during two visits in July 1746 by troops of the Campbell of Argyll Militia under the command of General John Campbell and the Royal Navy crew of HMS Furnace under the command of Captain John Fergussone. One witness account states that the original Raasay House and many other dwellings were burnt down, all the islanders' livestock were confiscated and slaughtered, and two women were assaulted. The Laird was afterwards taken prisoner by Captain Fergussone, transported aboard the Furnace to London, and held aboard a prison hulk anchored in the River Thames. The Laird's allegations are also confirmed by a still extant letter from Captain Fergussone to his naval superior, Commodore Thomas Smith, and by a brief entry in the Furnace's ship's log, "Set Raasa Isle afire."

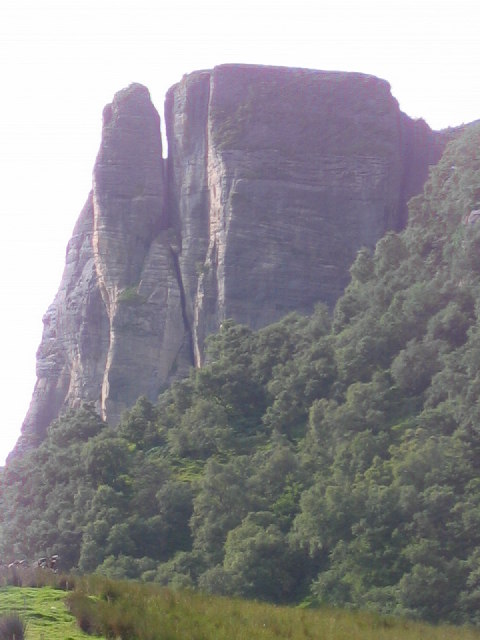
The cliffs of Creag na Bruaich, south of Brochel Castle

In 1773 James Boswell and Samuel Johnson arrived on the island during their Hebridean tour. They visited Raasay House and Johnson wrote:

Our reception exceeded our expectations. We found nothing but civility, elegance, and plenty. After the usual refreshments, and the usual conversation, the evening came upon us. The carpet was then rolled off the floor; the musician was called, and the whole company was invited to dance, nor did ever fairies trip with greater alacrity. The general air of festivity, which predominated in this place, so far remote from all those regions which the mind has been used to contemplate as the mansions of pleasure, struck the imagination with a delightful surprise, analogous to that which is felt at an unexpected emersion from darkness into light.

When it was time to sup, the dance ceased, and six and thirty persons sat down to two tables in the same room. After supper the ladies sung Erse songs, to which I listened as an English audience to an Italian opera, delighted with the sound of words which I did not understand.

Boswell went exploring and described the island as follows:

Having resolved to explore the island of Rasay, which could be done only on foot, I last night obtained my fellow-traveller’s permission to leave him for a day, he being unable to take so hardy a walk. Old Mr Malcolm M’Cleod, who had obligingly promised to accompany me, was at my bedside between five and six. I sprang up immediately, and he and I, attended by two other gentlemen, traversed the country during the whole of this day. Though we had passed over not less than four-and-twenty miles of very rugged ground, and had a Highland dance on the top of Dùn Can, the highest mountain in the island, we returned in the evening not at all fatigued, and piqued ourselves at not being outdone at the nightly ball by our less active friends, who had remained at home.

My survey of Rasay did not furnish much which can interest my readers; I shall therefore put into as short a compass as I can, the observations upon it, which I find registered in my journal. It is about fifteen English miles long, and four broad. On the south side is the laird’s family seat, situated on a pleasing low spot. The old tower of three stories, mentioned by Martin, was taken down soon after 1746, and a modern house supplies its place. There are very good grass-fields and corn-lands about it, well dressed. I observed, however, hardly any inclosures, except a good garden plentifully stocked with vegetables, and strawberries, raspberries, currants, &c.

=== 19th and 20th centuries ===
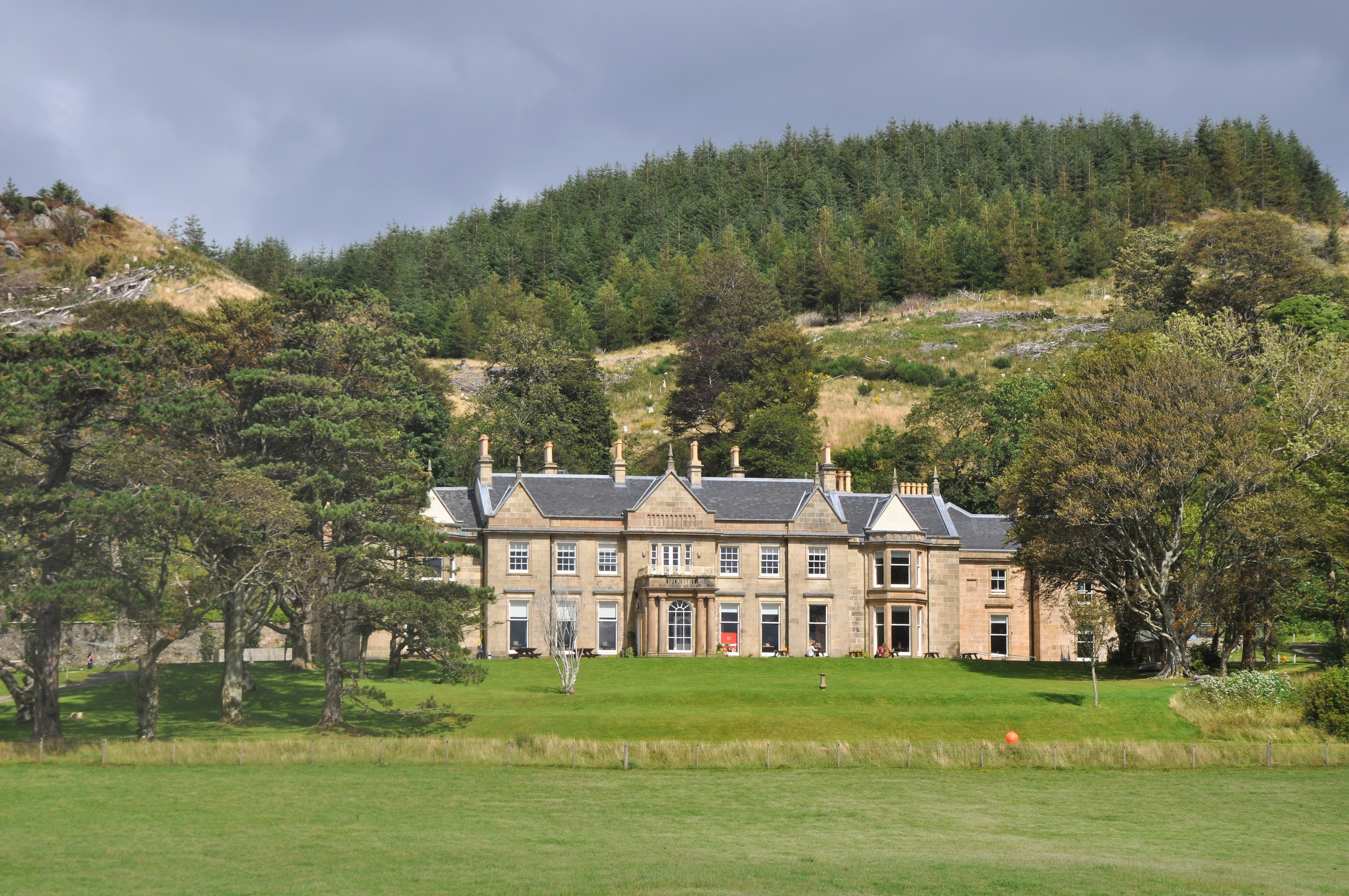
Raasay House

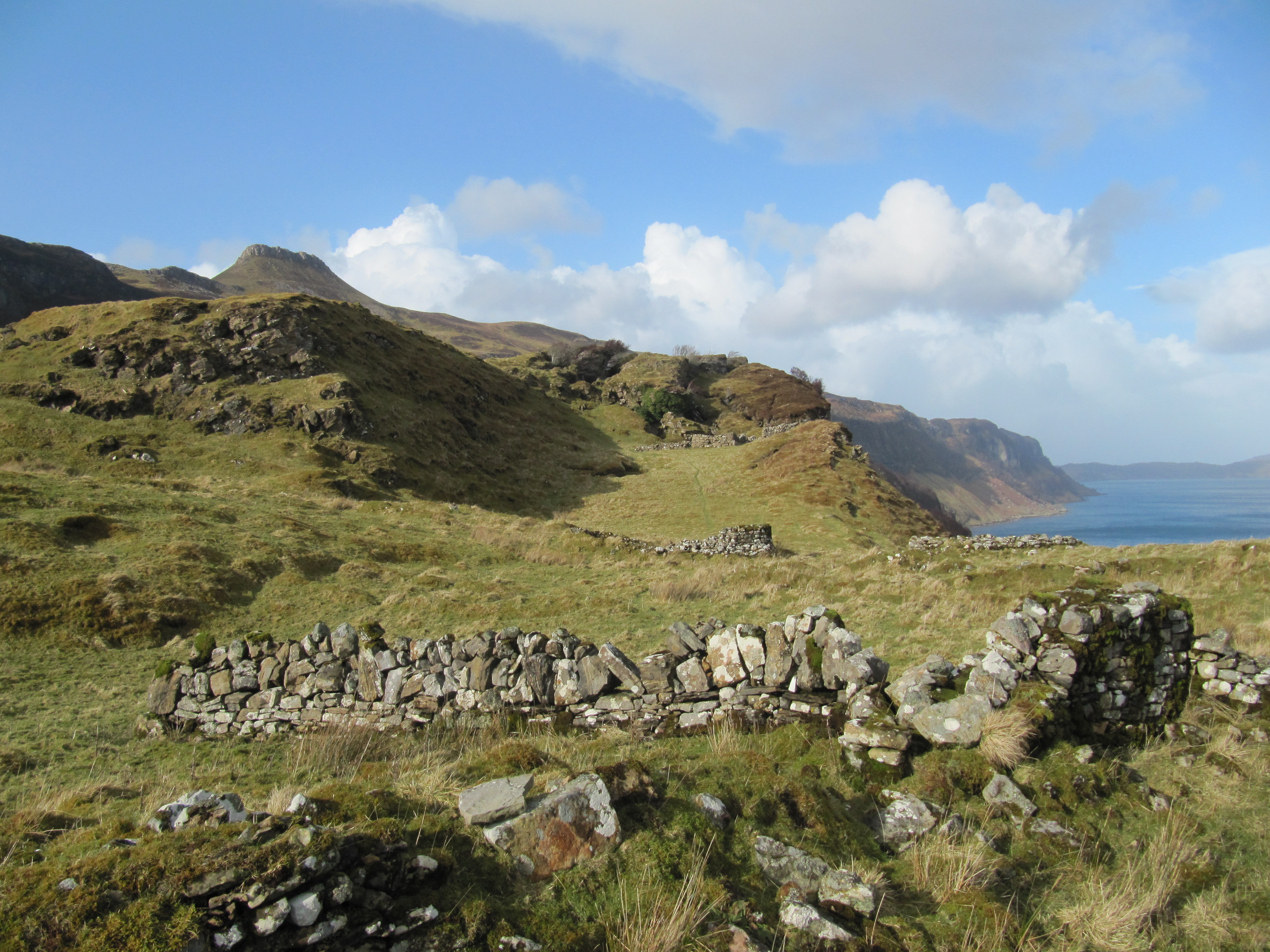
Ruined houses in the cleared township of Hallaig

In 1843 the last laird, John Macleod, was deep in debt and chose to emigrate to Tasmania having sold Raasay for 35,000 guineas to George Rainy. After the Highland Potato Famine of the 1840s, the new owner decided to convert as much arable land as possible to large scale sheep farming. This required the removal of the islanders, and his solution was to ban marriage. Several townships were cleared including most of the inhabited areas of the east coast. Hallaig was emptied in 1852-54 and the ruins of at least 25 buildings remain visible. North and South Screapadal are further north and contained at least 30 buildings when still inhabited. Two boatloads of emigrants left for Portland in Australia in 1854 as a result, and another 165 left for the same destination in 1865. The estate was then sold to Arthur E H Wood, and conflicts between the laird and the islanders grew as he decided to turn the island over to sporting purposes. Near Oskaig, there is a row of six houses which are known as Manitoba. Locals believe that this was a gathering place for people about to embark on emigrating to Canada in the late 19th century.

On 20 September 1862 the steamship Irishman ran aground on "Skernataid Rock" between Raasay and Scalpay. A 9.2 m (30 ft 2 in) vessel Spindrift is also recorded as having become jammed under the ferry pier at the sound end of the island and broken in two by the rising tide at an unspecified date. (Note: Baird suggests "Skernataid Rock" may be Sgeir Thraid at NG628334)

William Baird and Company signed a deed to purchase the estate of the Island of Raasay on 28 December 1910. The sale completed on 15 May 1911.

In May 1921, a group of crofters from Rona landed on Raasay and attempted to re-occupy their ancestral land. These so-called "Raasay Raiders" were arrested, tried and given prison sentences, but public support for them was strong and they were eventually freed and allowed to remain on Raasay.

The island was purchased by the government in 1922 after the mine closed. In 1949 The Forestry Commission was granted land bringing much-needed employment, and in 1956 The North of Scotland Hydro-Electric Board delivered mains electricity to the island. The power was generated by Storr Lochs Hydro-Electric Scheme, which was commissioned in 1952 and upgraded in 1956. Local residents and invited guests met at Balmeanach, on Skye, on 14 March 1956. Major General Harry Macdonald, who owned the Braes estate, operated the switch, and rockets were fired from Raasay to confirm that electricity had arrived through the undersea cable, which ran from An Aird in Braes to Suishnish. The guests were then transported to Raasay in fishing boats to complete the celebrations. In the 1960s Raasay House and various other properties were purchased by John Green, a doctor residing in Sussex who visited the island only once and whose lack of interest in it earned him the sobriquet "Dr No". Having purchased the property for £8,000 he sold it to the Highlands and Islands Development Board in 1979 for £135,000.

=== The Iron Mine ===
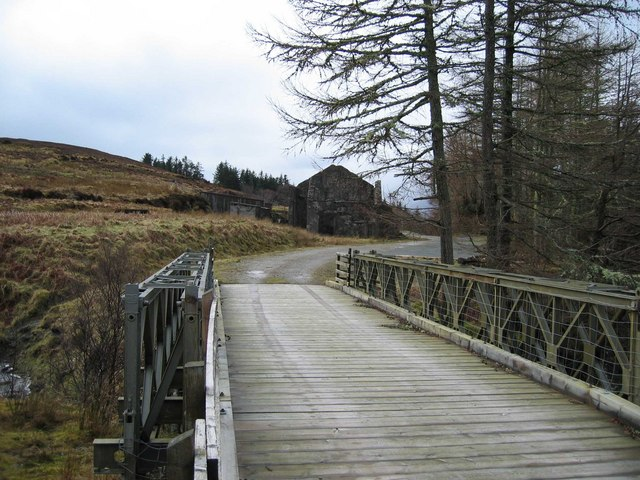
Inverarish iron ore mine

Nicolson reported an early bloomery on the island. The next record of ironstone on Raasay was by HB Woodward in 1893. Stead investigated the outcrop in 1909 and the subsequent analysis by Tatlock convinced Baird's to buy the island the following year (with completion in 1912).

Baird's original plan was for a railway from the outcrop site down to just south of Suisnish point (Note: Contemporary spelling was Suishnish) with the erection of five kilns. Objections led to the plan being revised for two kilns further south, where the current pier is. This pier was a public pier with landing charges regulated by government order. By the outbreak of war Baird's had completed the pier (constructed by Robert McAlpine & Sons), kilns, railway and "other works".

To house the workforce Baird's planned the village of Inverarish Houses, today known as Inverarish Terrace. The village consists of two facing rows of houses, each row being two terraces of 16 houses each. Between the terraces is a broad open area. Numbers 1–32 are the western row, 33–64 the eastern. The lower, southern terraces were built first (1–16 and 33–48) between 1912 and 1913. The first terraces were stone built and by 1914–15 were about half occupied. By the time of the 1915–16 valuation some of numbers 1–16 were unoccupied, just over half of numbers 33–48 were occupied and the newly built brick terrace of numbers 17–32 were also vacant. The unoccupied houses were caused by many of the labour force being called to the colours.

With the introduction of unrestricted submarine warfare in 1916 the Ministry of Munitions became concerned about the availability of foreign iron ore. Baird's were one company amongst others which opened up domestic mines in order to supply the war effort. In May 1916 Baird's signed an agreement to run the mine on behalf of the Ministry, although there was a minor skirmish over the amount of processing to be done on the island. This northern part of the village was converted into a prisoner-of-war camp by the simple expedient of building a barbed wire fence around it and erecting sentry boxes and arc lamps at the corners. The first prisoners were on the island by June and were housed in the upper part of the village, numbers 17–32 and the now completed 49–64.

== Population ==
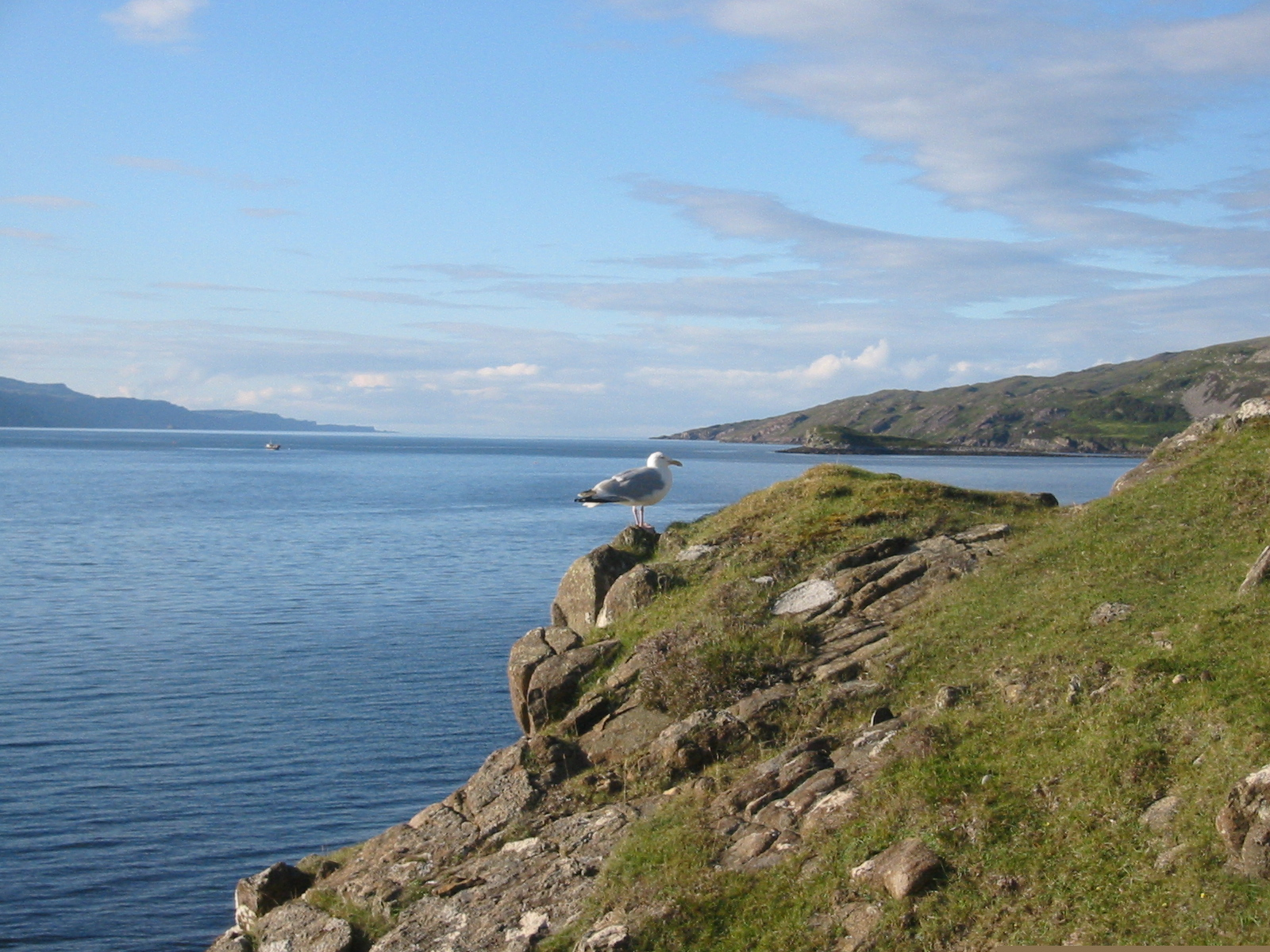
The Inner Sound, looking north

Year	1780	1803	1841	1881	1891	1931	1961	1981	1991	2001	2011	2022
Population	400 +	900 +	676	532	489	377	223	152	163	194	161	187

In 2001 Raasay had the lowest percentage of children of any populated Scottish island, and the island's population fell by over 16% since that time to the date of the 2011 census. During the same period Scottish island populations as a whole grew by 4% to 103,702. With 36% in the 2001 census there was still a relatively high density of Gaelic speakers (down from over 75% in 1901 and 1921). By 2022 the population had risen a little again to 187.

== Culture and the arts ==
=== Piping tradition ===
John MacKay, born on Raasay in 1767, was supported by the MacLeod Chief as the foremost island piper of his day and an inheritor of the MacCrimmon tradition. His son Angus published a collection of pibroch music in staff notation and was the first Piper to the Sovereign.

=== Sorley MacLean ===
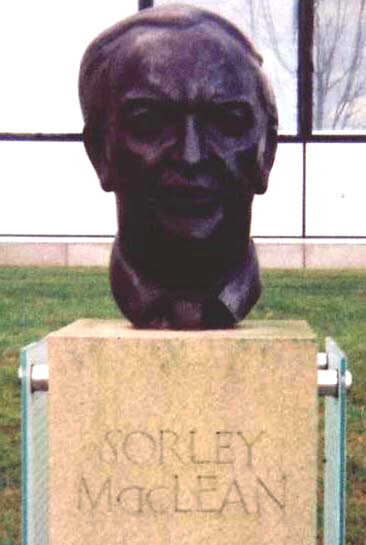

The poet Sorley MacLean was born in Osgaig, a small crofting community on the west coast of the island; perhaps his most famous poem is about Hallaig, an abandoned community on the east coast. MacLean's writings often combine an ancient traditional awareness, with a modernist political outlook, in which Raasay, and the areas adjacent to it are frequently referenced. But while MacLean's work dwells on the brutality of war, of the Highland Clearances and modern exploitation, he also writes about nature. Thus, although the Clearances leave an empty landscape populated only by the ghosts of those evicted or forced to emigrate, "Time, the deer, is in the Wood of Hallaig".

=== Calum's Road ===
The two miles (3 km) of road between Brochel Castle and Arnish were built using hand-tools by Calum MacLeod over ten years. Only when complete was the road surfaced by the local council; by then Calum and his wife were the last inhabitants of Arnish. Calum's Road has been commemorated in music both by Capercaillie on their 1988 album The Blood is Strong and by Runrig in Wall of China from the album The Stamping Ground, as well as in a book by Roger Hutchinson. The BBC Radio 4 drama Calum's Road, based on Hutchinson's book and dramatised by Colin MacDonald, was first broadcast on 5 October 2013 starring Ian McDiarmid as Calum MacLeod.

=== Harrison Birtwistle ===
The composer Harrison Birtwistle lived on Raasay from 1975 to 1983. His Duets for Storab, takes its name from Storab, a Viking prince who was shipwrecked and sought refuge on Raasay. Birtwistle's string quartet, The Tree of Strings, written in 2007, takes its title from a poem by Sorley MacLean.

== See also ==
- Land raid
