= Eilean Fladday =

Island in Highland, Scotland

Coordinates: 57°29′9″N 6°1′40″W

Eilean Fladday (also Fladda; Scottish Gaelic: Eilean Fladaigh) is a previously populated tidal island off Raasay, near the Isle of Skye, Scotland.

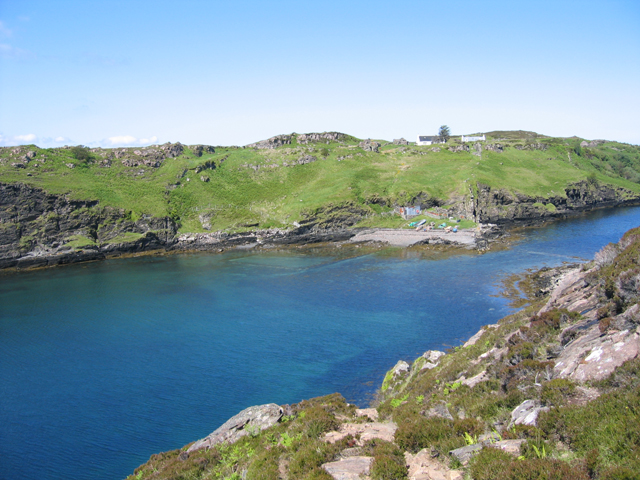
Caol Fladda looking towards Eilean Fladday

== Geography ==
Eilean Fladday lies off the north west coast of Raasay, across Caol Fladday (Kyle Fladda), which dries at half-tide.

Once a thriving crofting community, the island now only has three cottages which are used by the families who own them for about seven months a year. The population is recorded as 29 (1841), 51 (1891), 12 (1951) and 12 (1971). Five families lived there in the late 1920s. Their petition to Inverness County Council to build a road and footbridge was rejected. A subsequent appeal to the Education Department to provide a school, was successful only after a rate strike. Raasay crofter, Calum MacLeod (who later built "Calum's Road") constructed a track from Torran to Fladda between 1949 and 1952. This did not stem the exodus from the island and the last families left Fladda in 1965.

== See also ==
- List of islands of Scotland
