= Sound of Raasay =

Sound between the islands of Raasay and Skye of Scotland

Coordinates: 57°30′N 6°5′W

- Linne Ratharsair (Scottish Gaelic)
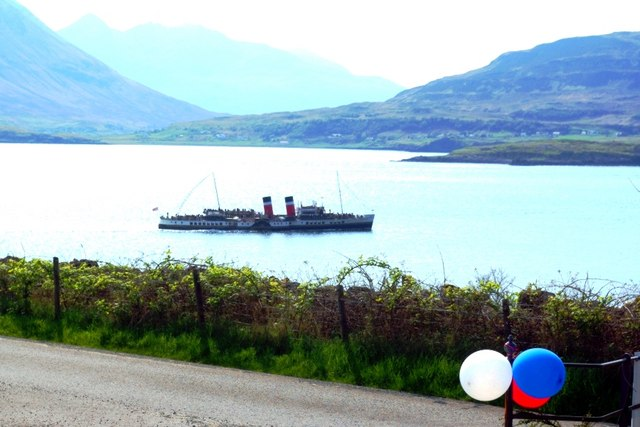
- Sound of Raasay

- Location of the Sound of Raasay within Scotland
- Basin countries: Scotland
- Average depth: 1,062 feet (324 m)

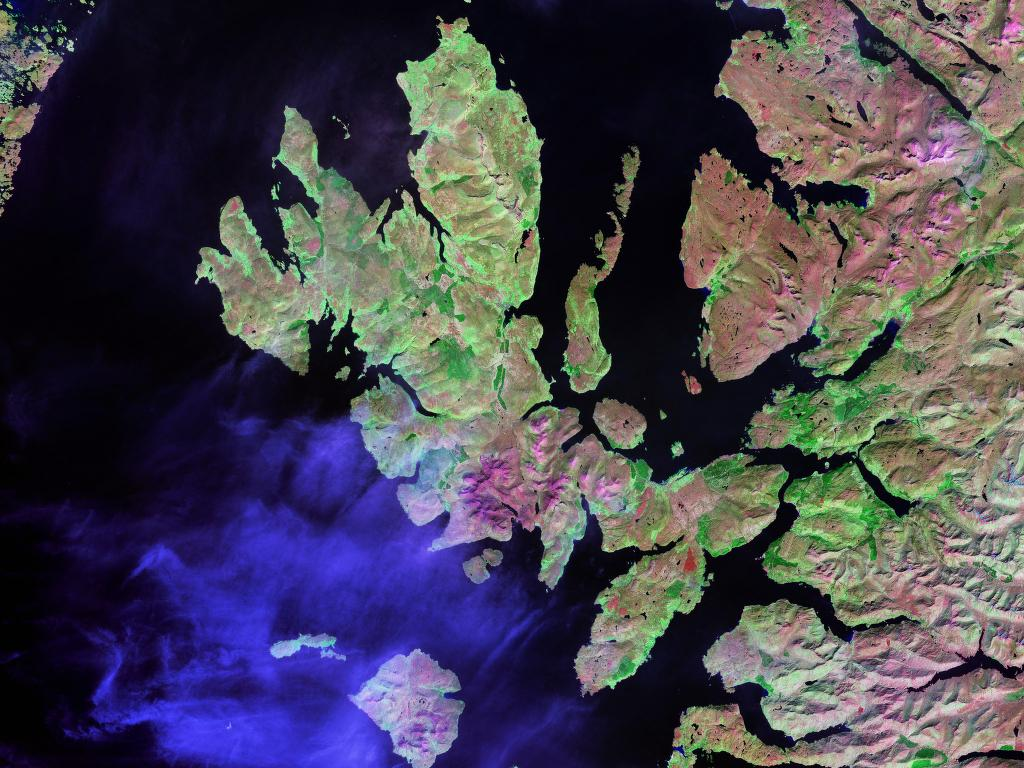
The Sound of Raasay lies between the thin finger of Raasay and the larger Isle of Skye.

The Sound of Raasay (Scottish Gaelic: Linne Ratharsair) is the sound between the islands of Raasay and Skye.

== See also ==
- Inner Sound, Scotland
- Isle of Skye
- Loch Kishorn
- Mealt Waterfall
- Quiraing

== External links and references ==
- One link, mentions Raasay's depth
