= The Amazing Race 22 =

Season of television series

- Season 22
- Region 1 DVD cover
- Presented by: Phil Keoghan
- No. of teams: 11
- Winners: Jonathan "Bates" & Anthony Battaglia
- No. of legs: 12
- Distance traveled: 30,000 mi (48,000 km)
- No. of episodes: 11

Release
- Original network: CBS
- Original release: February 17 – May 5, 2013

Additional information
- Filming dates: November 13 – December 7, 2012

Series chronology
- ← Previous; Season 21 Next → Season 23

The Amazing Race 22 is the twenty-second season of the American reality competition show The Amazing Race. Hosted by Phil Keoghan, it featured eleven teams of two, each with a pre-existing relationship, competing in a race around the world to win US$1,000,000. This season visited five continents and ten countries and traveled over 30,000 miles (48,000 km) during twelve legs. Starting in Los Angeles, racers traveled through French Polynesia, New Zealand, Indonesia, Vietnam, Botswana, Switzerland, Germany, Scotland, Northern Ireland, and England before returning to the United States and finishing in the National Capital Region. A new twist introduced in this season includes awarding the winners of the first leg two Express Passes, one for them and one to give to another team. The season premiered on CBS on February 17, 2013, and concluded on May 5, 2013.

Professional hockey players and brothers Bates Battaglia and Anthony Battaglia were the winners of this season, while newlyweds Max Bichler and Katie Kaczor-Bichler finished in second place, and roller derby moms Mona Hinman-Egender and Beth Bandimere finished in third place.

== Production ==
=== Development and filming ===
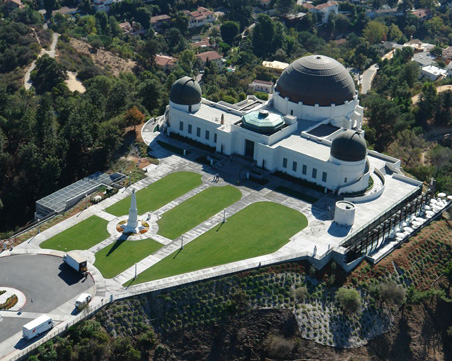
Los Angeles's Griffith Observatory was the starting line for the 22nd Amazing Race.

Filming for this season took started on November 13, 2012. On November 18, the show traveled through Christchurch, New Zealand, before leaving for Bali the next day. Filming for this season concluded on December 7. The route spanned 30,000 miles (48,000 km) through five different continents, with first-time visits to French Polynesia and Northern Ireland.

This season was broadcast in the mid-season of the 2012–13 TV schedule. In an interview with TV Guide, host Phil Keoghan revealed that the Double Your Money prize introduced in the previous season would not be included in season 22. Instead, the twist this season was that the winners of the first leg were awarded two Express Passes: one for themselves and another that had to be given to another team before the end of Leg 4.

Dave O'Leary tore his Achilles tendon near the end of the second leg. Though he and his son, Connor, continued to race for another two legs with Dave being forced to use a medical boot, crutches, and a wheelchair while in airports, they chose to withdraw from the race at the start of the fifth leg after Dave was advised by his physician to have surgery within two weeks of the original injury. Although Dave & Connor traveled to Hanoi, Vietnam, with the remaining teams, they did not participate in any tasks in that leg; instead, they went directly to the Pit Stop to be formally eliminated. Dave returned to the United States in time to have the surgery the day before filming of the season was completed and was able to be at the finish line. He and Connor returned to compete in season 24.

The final episode was dedicated to David Gene Gibbs, a member of the camera crew, who died in a helicopter crash while filming a series for Discovery Channel.

== Contestants ==
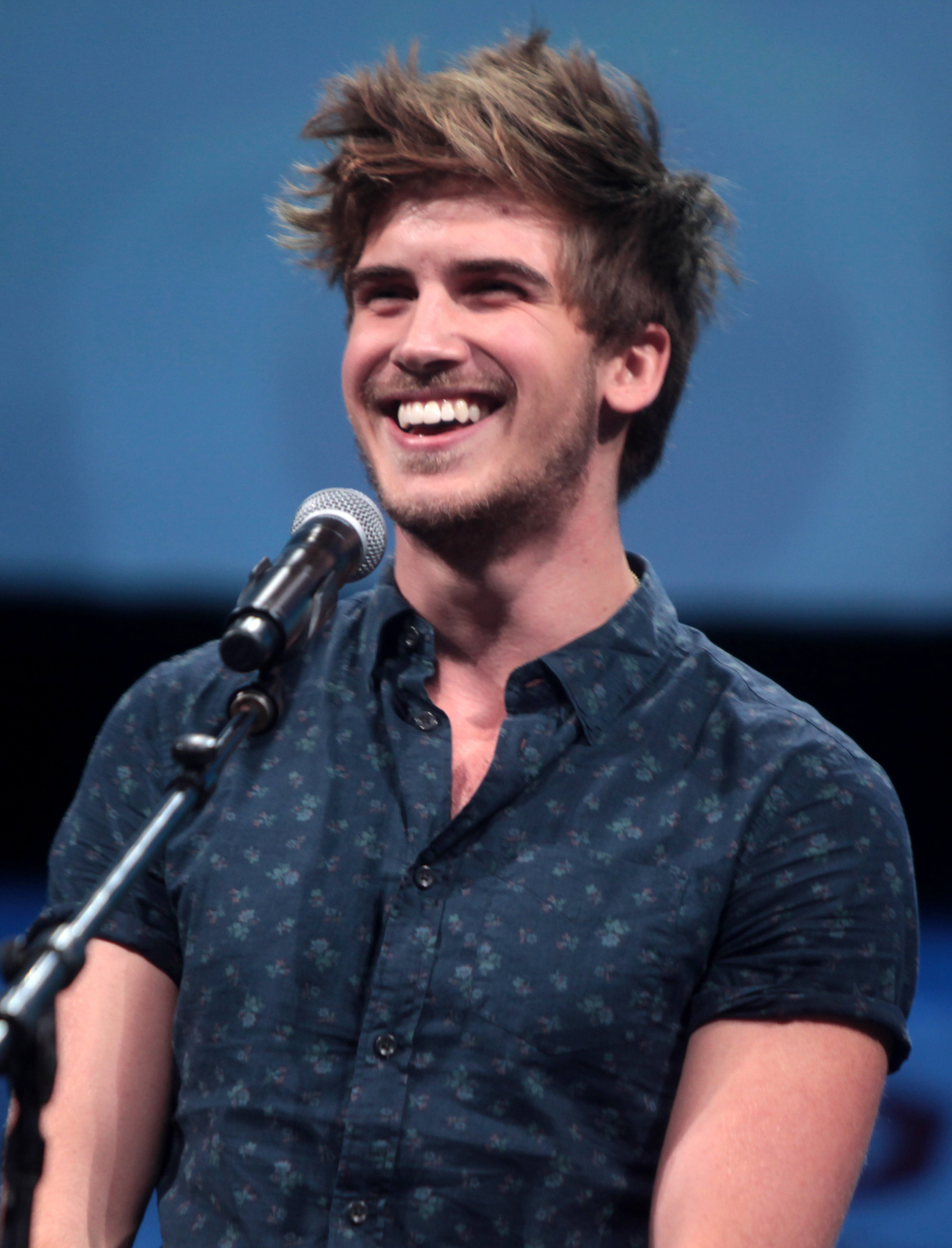
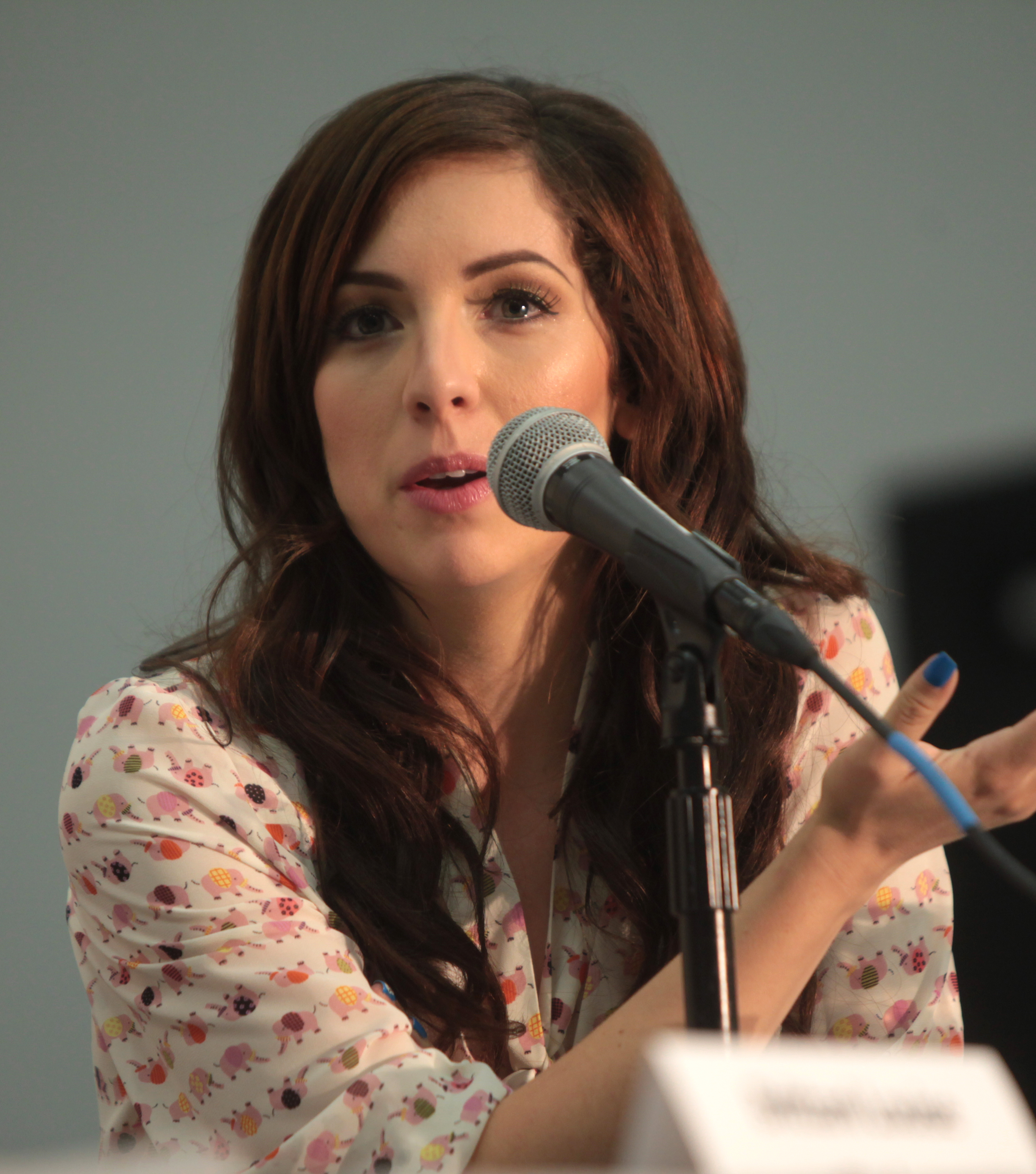
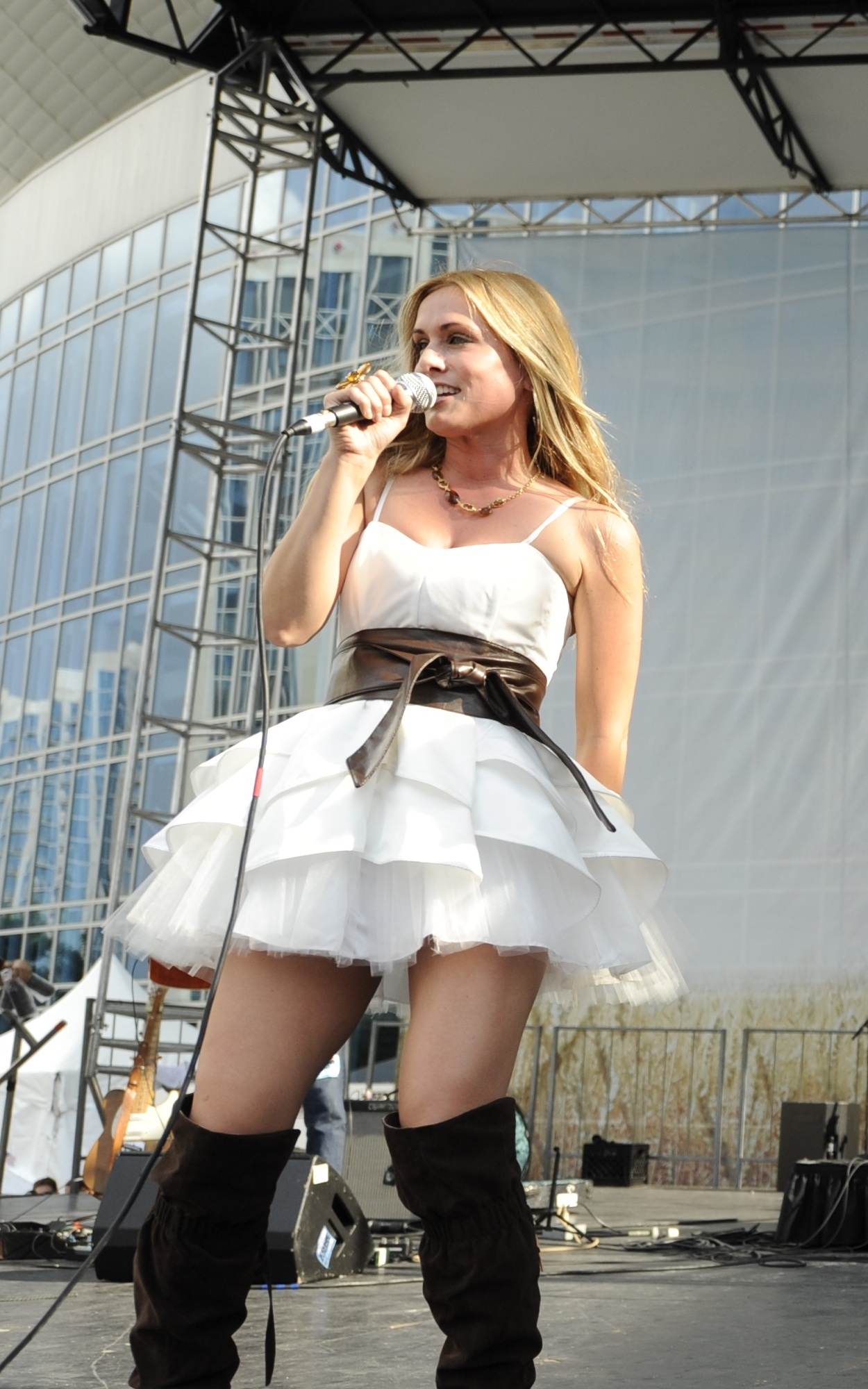
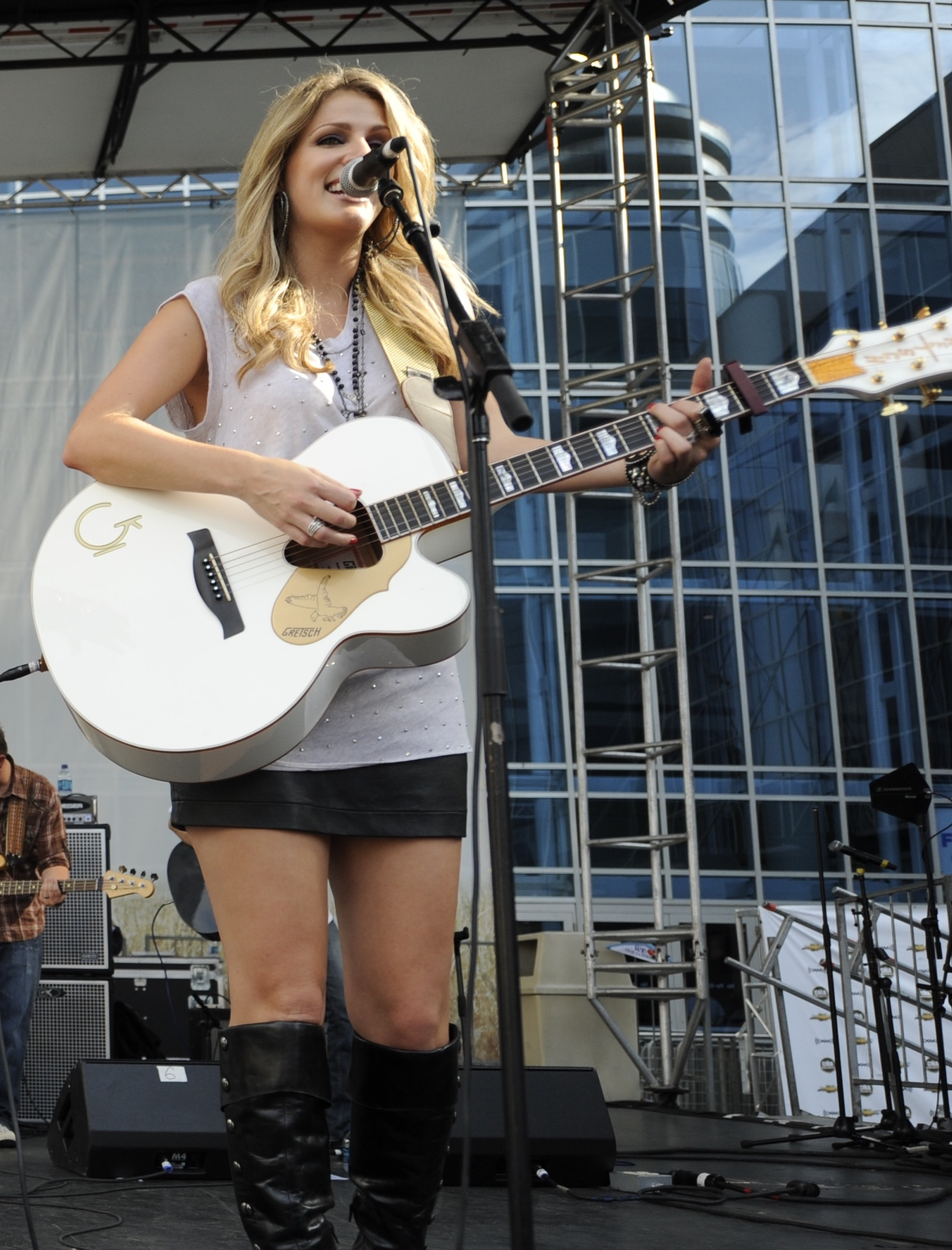
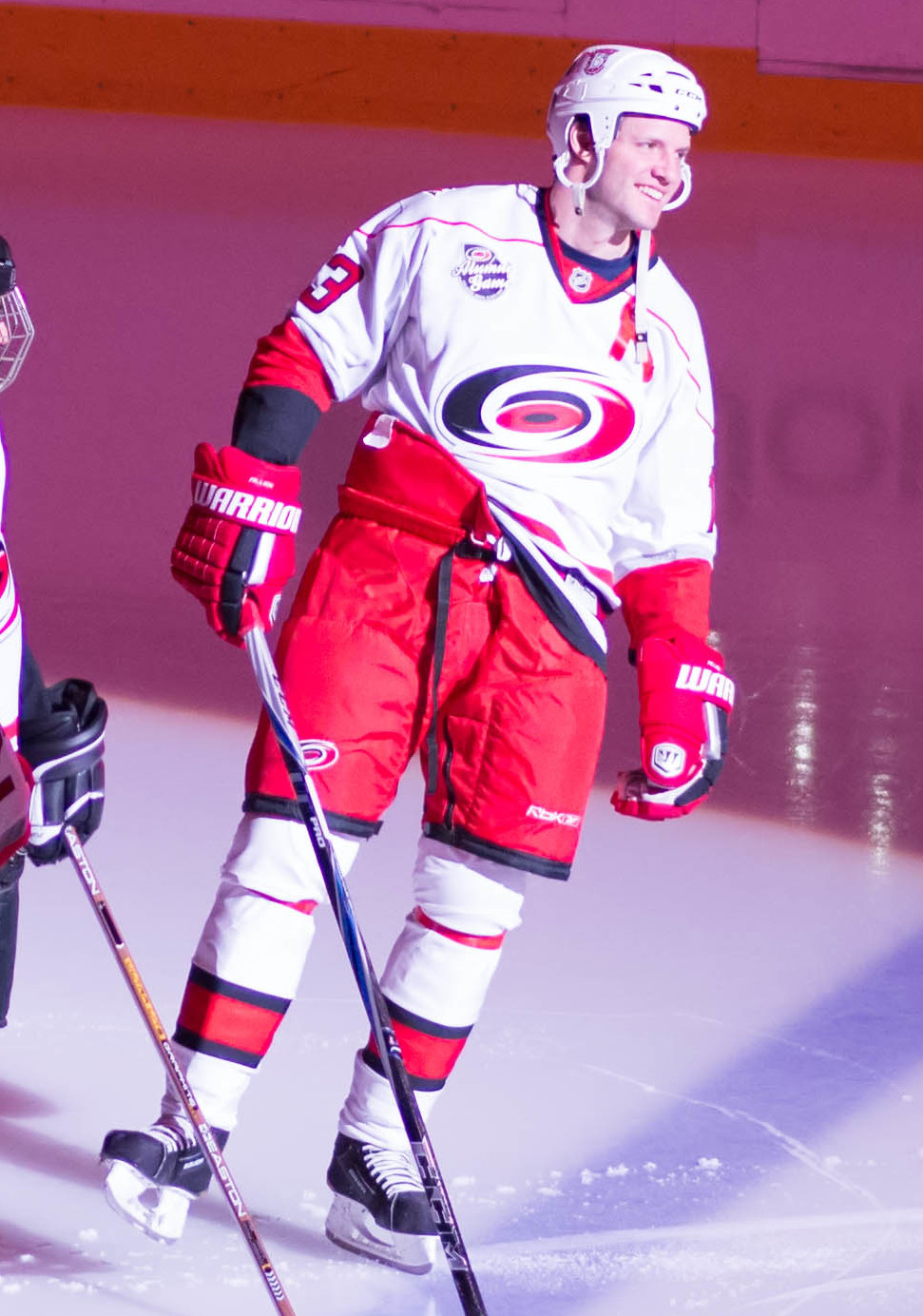
From left to right: Joey Graceffa, Meghan Camarena, Caroline Cutbirth, Jennifer Kuhle, and Bates Battaglia

Teams for this season included Stealing Angels vocalists Caroline Cutbirth and Jennifer Kuhle, professional hockey players and brothers Bates Battaglia and Anthony Battaglia (of the Tulsa Oilers), and YouTube vloggers Joey Graceffa and Meghan Camarena.

Chuck & Wynona were originally cast for the previous season, but had to pull out due to the death of Chuck's father.

Contestants	Age	Relationship	Hometown	Status
Matt Davis	25	Firefighters	Gaffney, South Carolina	Eliminated 1st (in Motu Piti A'au, French Polynesia)
Daniel Moss	24	Firefighters	Gaffney, South Carolina	Eliminated 1st (in Motu Piti A'au, French Polynesia)
Idries Abdur-Rahman	36	Twin Doctors	Chicago, Illinois	Eliminated 2nd (in Motu Tapu, French Polynesia)
Jamil Abdur-Rahman	36	Twin Doctors	Chicago, Illinois	Eliminated 2nd (in Motu Tapu, French Polynesia)
Jessica Hoel	26	Dating	Huntington Beach, California	Eliminated 3rd (in Pecatu, Indonesia)
John Erck	27	Dating	Huntington Beach, California	Eliminated 3rd (in Pecatu, Indonesia)
Dave O'Leary	58	Father & Son	Salt Lake City, Utah	Withdrew (in Hanoi, Vietnam)
Connor O'Leary	21	Father & Son	Salt Lake City, Utah	Withdrew (in Hanoi, Vietnam)
Pam Chien	29	Best Friends	Los Angeles, California	Eliminated 5th (in Maun, Botswana)
Winnie Sung	29	Best Friends	Los Angeles, California	Eliminated 5th (in Maun, Botswana)
Chuck McCall	46	Married	Daphne, Alabama	Eliminated 6th (in Grindelwald, Switzerland)
Wynona McCall	49	Married	Daphne, Alabama	Eliminated 6th (in Grindelwald, Switzerland)
Joey Graceffa	21	YouTube Hosts	Los Angeles, California	Eliminated 7th (in Edinburgh, Scotland)
Meghan Camarena	25	YouTube Hosts	Los Angeles, California	Eliminated 7th (in Edinburgh, Scotland)
Caroline Cutbirth	29	Country Singers	Austin, Texas	Eliminated 8th (in Belfast, Northern Ireland)
Jennifer Kuhle	30	Country Singers	Nashville, Tennessee	Eliminated 8th (in Belfast, Northern Ireland)
Mona Hinman-Egender	33	Roller Derby Moms	Castle Pines, Colorado	Third place
Beth Bandimere	36	Roller Derby Moms	Arvada, Colorado	Third place
Max Bichler	30	Newlyweds	Buffalo, New York	Runners-up
Katie Kaczor-Bichler	24	Newlyweds	Buffalo, New York	Runners-up
Bates Battaglia	36	Hockey Brothers	Raleigh, North Carolina	Winners
Anthony Battaglia	33	Hockey Brothers	Raleigh, North Carolina	Winners

Future appearances

Dave & Connor, Caroline & Jennifer, Jessica & John, and Joey & Meghan returned in The Amazing Race: All-Stars. Caroline & Jennifer appeared as clue givers during the finale of season 34 in Nashville.

== Results ==
The following teams are listed with their placements in each leg. Placements are listed in finishing order.

- A red placement with a dagger (†) indicates that the team was eliminated.
- An underlined blue placement with a double-dagger (‡) indicates that the team was the last to arrive at a Pit Stop in a non-elimination leg, and had to perform a Speed Bump task in the following leg.
- An italicized and underlined placement indicates that the team was the last to arrive at a Pit Stop, but there was no rest period at the Pit Stop and all teams were instructed to continue racing. There was no required Speed Bump task in the next leg.
- A green ƒ indicates that the team won the Fast Forward.
- A purple ε indicates that the team used an Express Pass on that leg to bypass one of their tasks.
- A brown ⊃ indicates that the team used the U-Turn and a brown ⊂ indicates the team on the receiving end of the U-Turn.

Team placement (by leg)
Team	1	2	3	4	5	6	7	8	9	10	11	12
Bates & Anthony	2nd	1st	3rd	7th	4th	1st	1stƒ (Note: This team won the Fast Forward on this leg.)	1st	4th	2nd⊃ (Note: Bates & Anthony chose to use the U-Turn on Joey & Meghan.)	2nd	1st
Max & Katie	9th	8th	8th	3rd	2nd	7th‡	6th	3rd	1st	1st⊃ (Note: Max & Katie chose to use the U-Turn on Mona & Beth.)	1st	2nd
Mona & Beth	5th	6th	7th	6th	3rd	6th	2nd	2nd	5th‡	4th⊂	3rd	3rd
Caroline & Jennifer	10th	7th	6th	4th	5th	5th	3rd	4th	3rd	3rd	4th†	
Joey & Meghan	6th	4th	5th	5th	6th^{⊂}_{⊃} (Note: Pam & Winnie chose to use the U-Turn on Joey & Meghan.) (Note: Joey & Meghan chose to use the U-Turn on Chuck & Wynona.)	4th	5th	5th	2nd	5th†⊂		
Chuck & Wynona	7th	5th	9th (Note: This team arrived last at the Pit Stop, but they were instructed to continue racing.)	8th	7th⊂ (Note: Chuck & Wynona arrived last at the Pit Stop, but were not eliminated on account of Dave & Connor having left the race.)	3rd	4th	6th† (Note: Chuck & Wynona initially arrived 5th, but were issued a 30-minute penalty for rolling their cheese wheels down the hill instead of using the provided sled as their clue had instructed. Joey & Meghan checked in during this penalty time, dropping Chuck & Wynona to last.)				
Pam & Winnie	4th	9th	4th	2nd	1st⊃	2nd	7th†					
Dave & Connor	3rd	2nd	1stε (Note: Dave & Connor used their Express Pass to bypass the Detour on this leg.)	1st	† (Note: Dave & Connor chose to leave the race at the start of fifth leg due to an injury Dave had sustained at the end of the second leg.)							
Jessica & John	1st	3rd	2nd	9th†								
Idries & Jamil	8th	10th†										
Matt & Daniel	11th†											

== Race summary ==
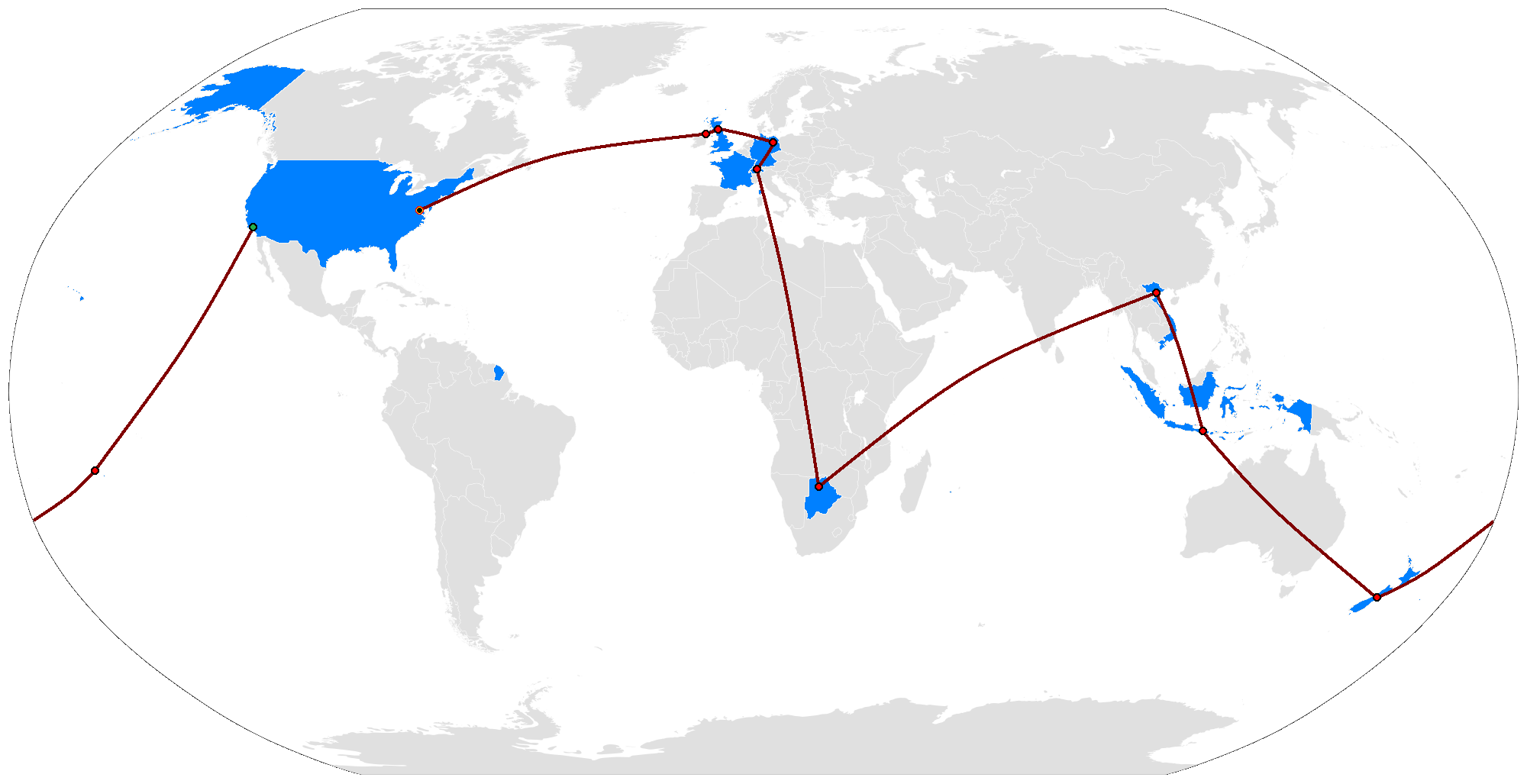
The route of The Amazing Race 22.

Destinations	Air travel Rail travel Water travel Bus travel Helicopter travel Bicycle travel Gondola travel
Route Markers	Detour Roadblock Fast Forward U-Turn Speed Bump Pit Stop

=== Leg 1 (United States → French Polynesia) ===
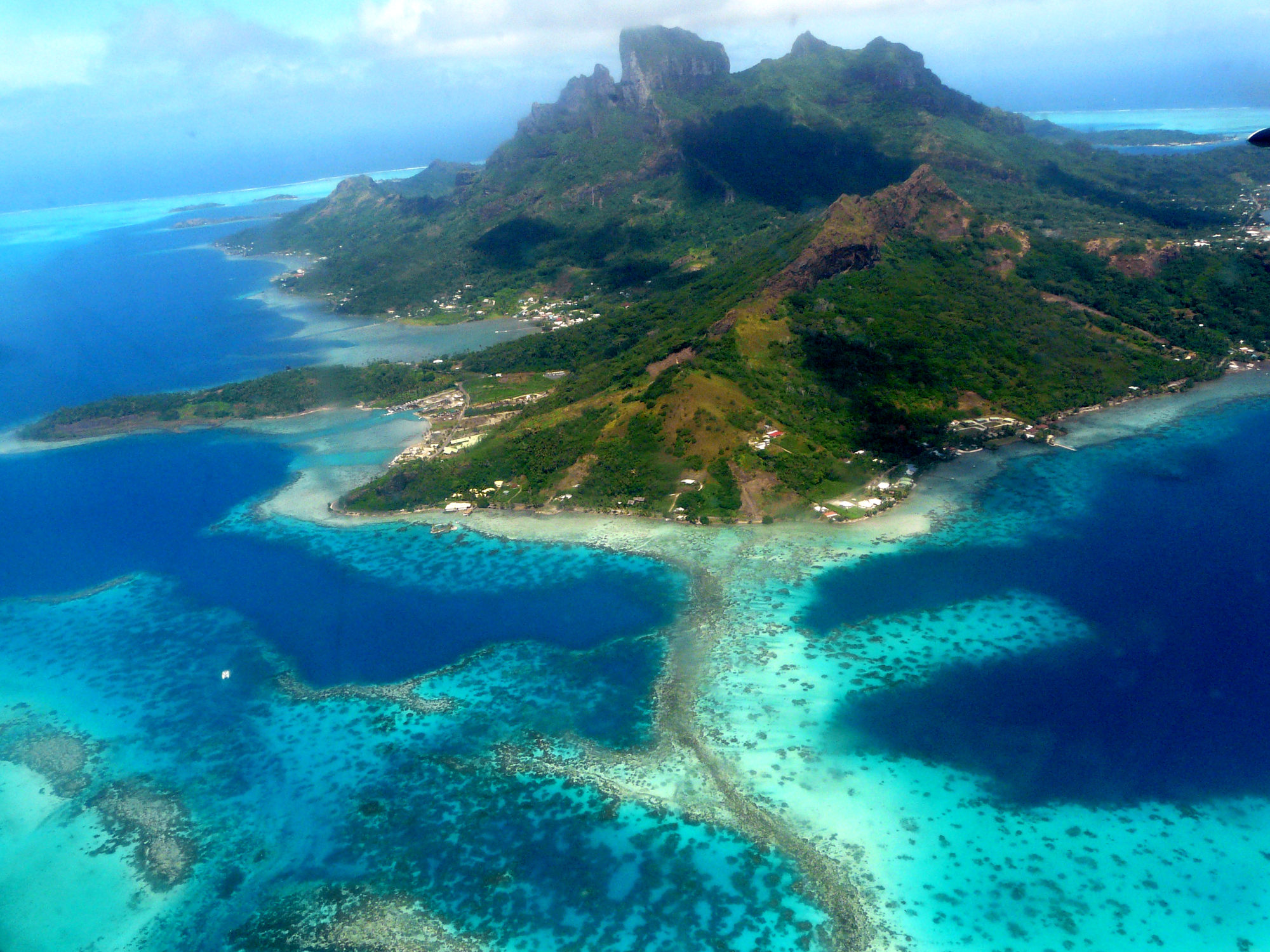
While in French Polynesia, teams visited Bora Bora, an island located in the South Pacific.

- Episode 1: "Business in the Front, Party in the Back" (February 17, 2013)
- Prize: Two Express Passes (awarded to Jessica & John; one for themselves and the other to be given to another team)
- Eliminated: Matt & Daniel

Locations

- Los Angeles, California (Griffith Observatory) (Starting Line)
- Los Angeles → Bora Bora, French Polynesia (Bora Bora Airport)
- Anau (Maohi Protestant Church) → Motu Piti A'au (Eden Beach)
- Motu Piti A'au (Motu Café)

Episode summary

- Teams set off from the Griffith Observatory and drove to Los Angeles International Airport, where they had to book one of two flights to the island of Bora Bora in French Polynesia. The first five teams arrived on the first flight one hour before the remaining six teams on the second flight. Once there, teams found their next clue outside the Bora Bora Airport.
- In this season's first Roadblock, one team member had to sign up for one of six helicopter flights. They then had to perform a tandem skydive from over 10,000 feet (3,000 m) above the island while their partner traveled via water taxi to the landing zone on Anau. Once the team members reunited, they were given their next clue.
- After the first Roadblock, teams had to travel by water taxi to Eden Beach, where they found their next clue.
- In this leg's second Roadblock, the team member who did not perform the previous Roadblock had to search among 400 sandcastles for one with a clue buried beneath it. If a sandcastle didn't have a clue, they had to rebuild it before they could search under another.
- After the second Roadblock, teams had to assemble a va'a outrigger canoe and then paddle to the Pit Stop: Motu Café.

Additional note

- Katie, Jennifer, and Daniel chose to quit the second Roadblock. Max & Katie and Caroline & Jennifer were issued four-hour penalties that were applied at the start of the next leg, while Matt & Daniel were the last team to arrive at the Pit Stop and were therefore eliminated.

=== Leg 2 (French Polynesia) ===
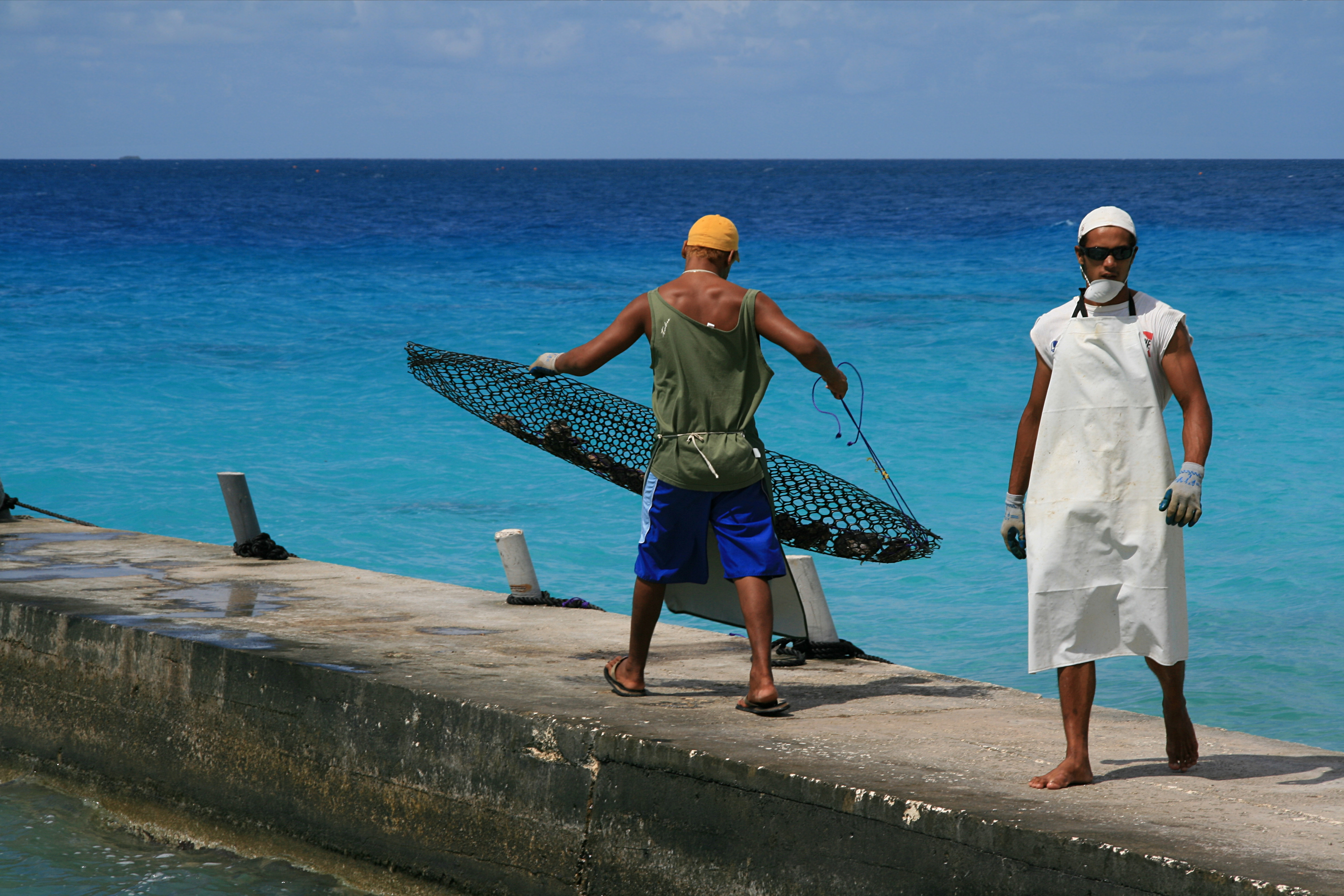
One of the two Detour choices in Bora Bora involved the Polynesian tradition of pearl farming.

- Episode 2: "Loose Lips Sink Ships" (February 24, 2013)
- Prize: A trip for two to London, England (awarded to Bates & Anthony)
- Eliminated: Idries & Jamil

Locations

- Motu Toopua (Water Taxi Pier)
- Motu Toopua (Hilton Bora Bora Nui)
- Bora Bora (Pofai Bay)
- Bora Bora (Motu Tapu)

Episode summary

- At the start of this leg, teams had to board a water taxi and travel to the Hilton Bora Bora Nui, where teams had to search for a wedding chapel and find a Polynesian priest, who gave them a traditional blessing and their next clue.
- This season's first Detour was a choice between Pick a Pearl or Take a Trunk. In Pick a Pearl, teams traveled offshore, where they had to dive down and untie lines of pearl oysters. They then had to open them until they found two red pearls and then swim to an oyster farmer where they could trade them for their next clue. In Take a Trunk, teams dove underwater, wearing special diving helmets, to a series of treasure trunks. They then had to unpack its contents and set up an underwater picnic table in order to receive their next clue.
- After the Detour, teams had to choose a personal water craft and use a map to guide them to Motu Tapu, where they found their next clue.
- In this leg's Roadblock, one team member participated in a traditional Polynesian test of strength by walking on a pair of stilts while kicking a coconut across a 35-yard (32 m) stretch of beach. If they fell, they had to return to the start to resume, but the position of the coconut was not reset. Once they successfully kicked the coconut over the finish line, teams could run to the nearby Pit Stop.

Additional note

- Dave tore his Achilles tendon near the end of this leg while running to the Pit Stop.

=== Leg 3 (French Polynesia → New Zealand) ===
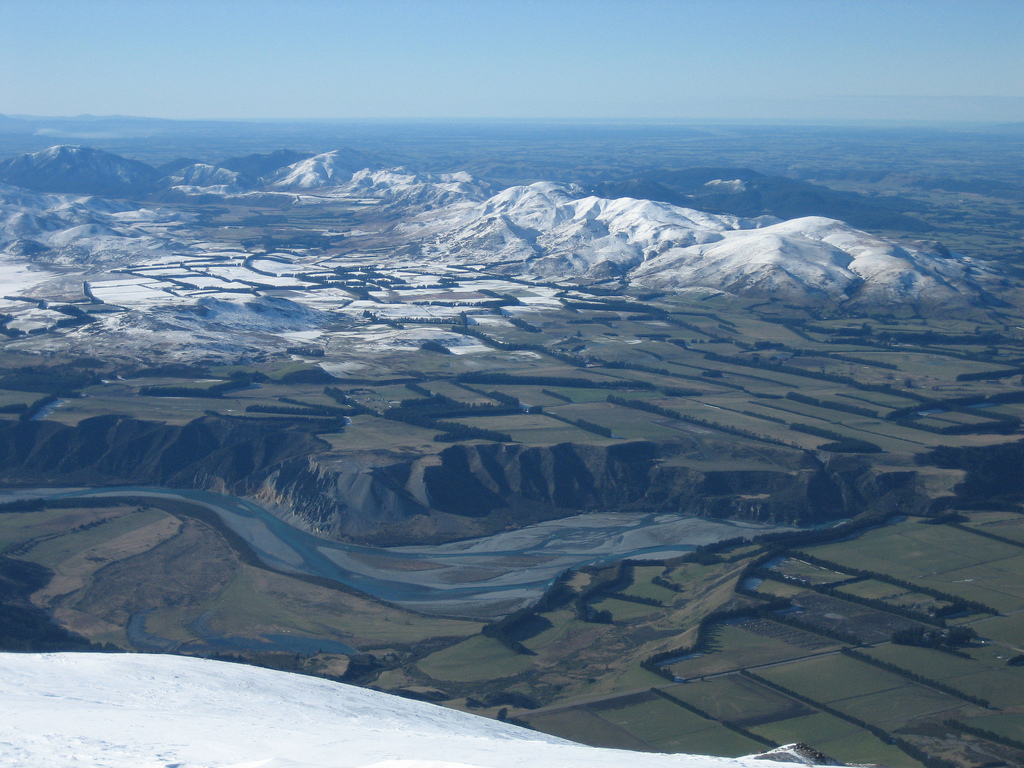
The tasks on this leg focused on New Zealand's Southern Alps, especially the valley below Mount Hutt and its Rakaia River.

- Episode 3: "Like James Bond Again" (March 3, 2013)
- Prize: A trip for two to Bangkok, Thailand (awarded to Dave & Connor)

Locations

- Tevairoa (Bora Bora Pearl Beach Resort & Spa)
- Tevairoa → Motu Mute
- Motu Mute → Christchurch, New Zealand
- Windwhistle (Rakaia River Gorge)
- Methven (Mount Hutt Station)
- Windwhistle (Terrace Downs)

Episode summary

- At the start of this leg, teams were instructed to travel by water taxi back to Motu Mute and then fly to Christchurch, New Zealand. Once there, teams had to drive to the Rakaia River Gorge, where they had to choose a departure time the next day and then camp for the night. At their designated time, teams had to choose a jetboat and navigate the river to find their next clue.
- This leg's Detour was a choice between Rev It Up or Reel It In. For both Detour tasks, teams had to use provided ATVs to reach their respective task. In Rev It Up, both team members had to drive a modified vintage car through a set of cones in under a combined 83-second time limit in order to receive their next clue. In Reel It In, each team member had to use a rod and reel to catch one fish at least 12 inches (30 cm) long in order to receive their next clue. Dave & Connor used their Express Pass to bypass this task.
- After the Detour, teams had to drive to Mount Hutt Station and find their next clue.
- In this leg's Roadblock, one team member had to run a muddy obstacle course known as a "Shemozzle". They first had to don gum boots, stubbies shorts, and a burlap sack. Then, along with a shepherd and farm dog, they had to run through the course, climb over hay bales, and then finally ride an inner tube down a slide into a manure pond, all while collecting chicken eggs along the way, which they had to put in a basket at the end of the course. Once racers had twelve unbroken eggs, they received their next clue, which directed them to the Pit Stop: Terrace Downs in Windwhistle.

Additional notes

- While waiting for their flight at Bora Bora Airport, Jessica & John gave their second Express Pass to Dave & Connor.
- All teams had to connect through Papeete, Tahiti, on their way to New Zealand. After arriving in Tahiti, Dave & Connor went to a local hospital, where Dave discovered that he had torn both his Achilles tendon and the connecting muscle. Dave & Connor purchased a boot for Dave's leg and they then returned to the airport to continue the race.
- No team was eliminated at the end of this leg; all teams were instead instructed to continue racing.

=== Leg 4 (New Zealand → Indonesia) ===
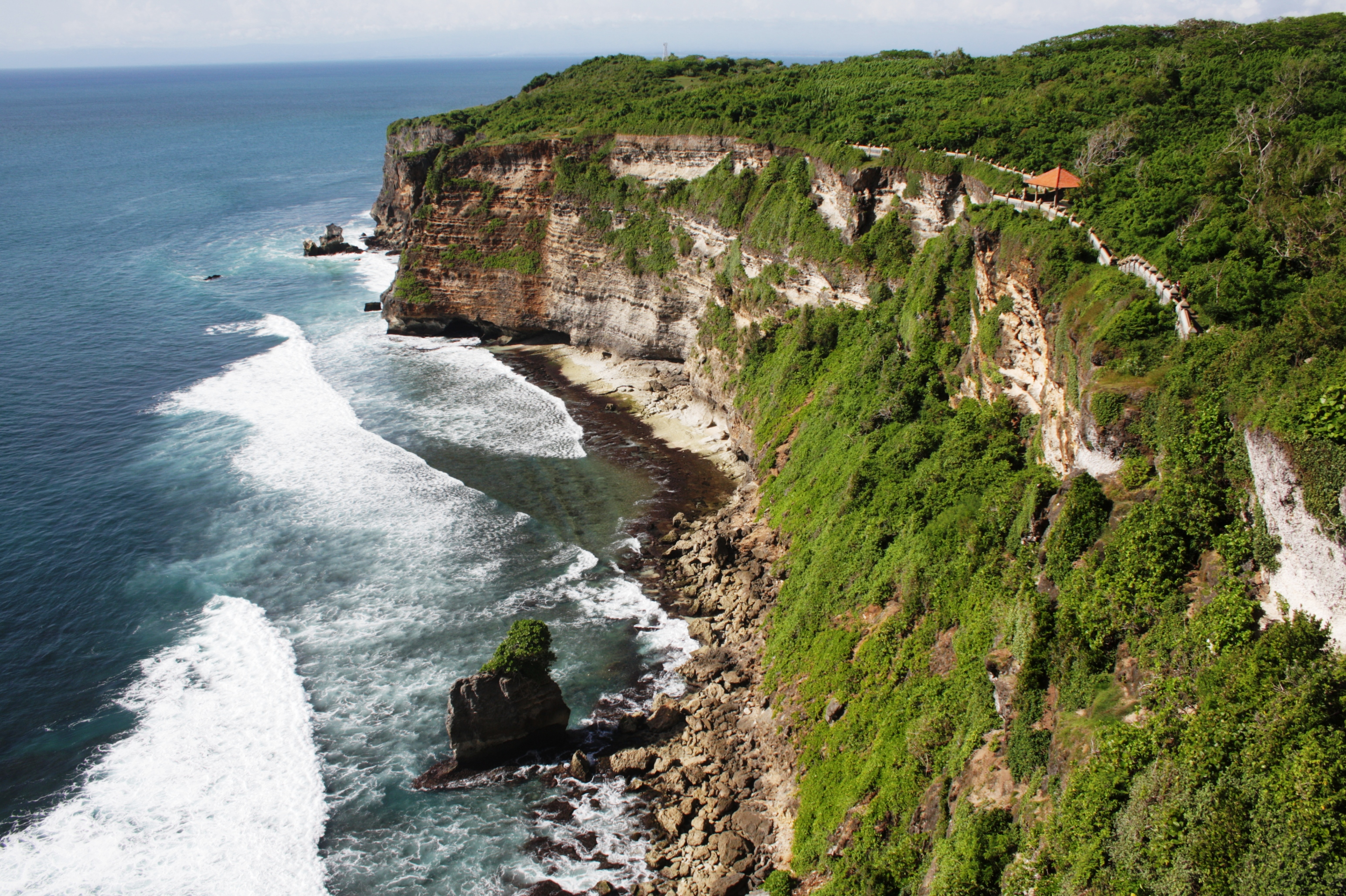
Teams ended the fourth leg on the edge of Pura Luhur Uluwatu cliff on the south coast of Bali with a direct view of the Indian Ocean.

- Episode 4: "I Love Monkeys!" (March 10, 2013)
- Prize: US$5,000 each (awarded to Dave & Connor)
- Eliminated: Jessica & John

Locations

- Christchurch → Denpasar, Indonesia
- Ubud (Ubud Monkey Forest)
- Gianyar (Ayung River or Pura Desa Puseh Temple)
- Pecatu (Uluwatu Surf Beach)
- Pecatu (Ketut's Surf Shop)
- Pecatu (Pura Luhur Uluwatu Cliff)

Episode summary

- At the start of this leg, teams were instructed to fly to Denpasar, Indonesia, on the island of Bali. Once there, teams had to travel to the Ubud Monkey Forest and leave a coconut, which contained a canister with their next clue inside, for a monkey to open.
- This leg's Detour was a choice between Sandy Bottom or Fruity Top. In Sandy Bottom, teams had to dredge volcanic sand from the bottom of the Ayung River and transport it uphill to a larger container. Once teams filled their container, they received their next clue. In Fruity Top, teams had to dress in sarongs and prepare a Balinese religious offering known as a gebogan from a variety of fruits. They then had to carry it in a procession to the Pura Desa Puseh Temple and place it on an altar in order to receive their next clue.
- After the Detour, teams had to travel to Uluwatu Surf Beach on the Bukit Peninsula in order to find their next clue.
- In this leg's Roadblock, one team member had to go to Ketut's Surf Shop and search among several surfboards for one with an image from a previous leg: the Polynesian priest from Bora Bora. After taking a surfboard, racers had to search for their partner at the Pit Stop. Teams could only be checked in if they had the correct surfboard.

=== Leg 5 (Indonesia → Vietnam) ===
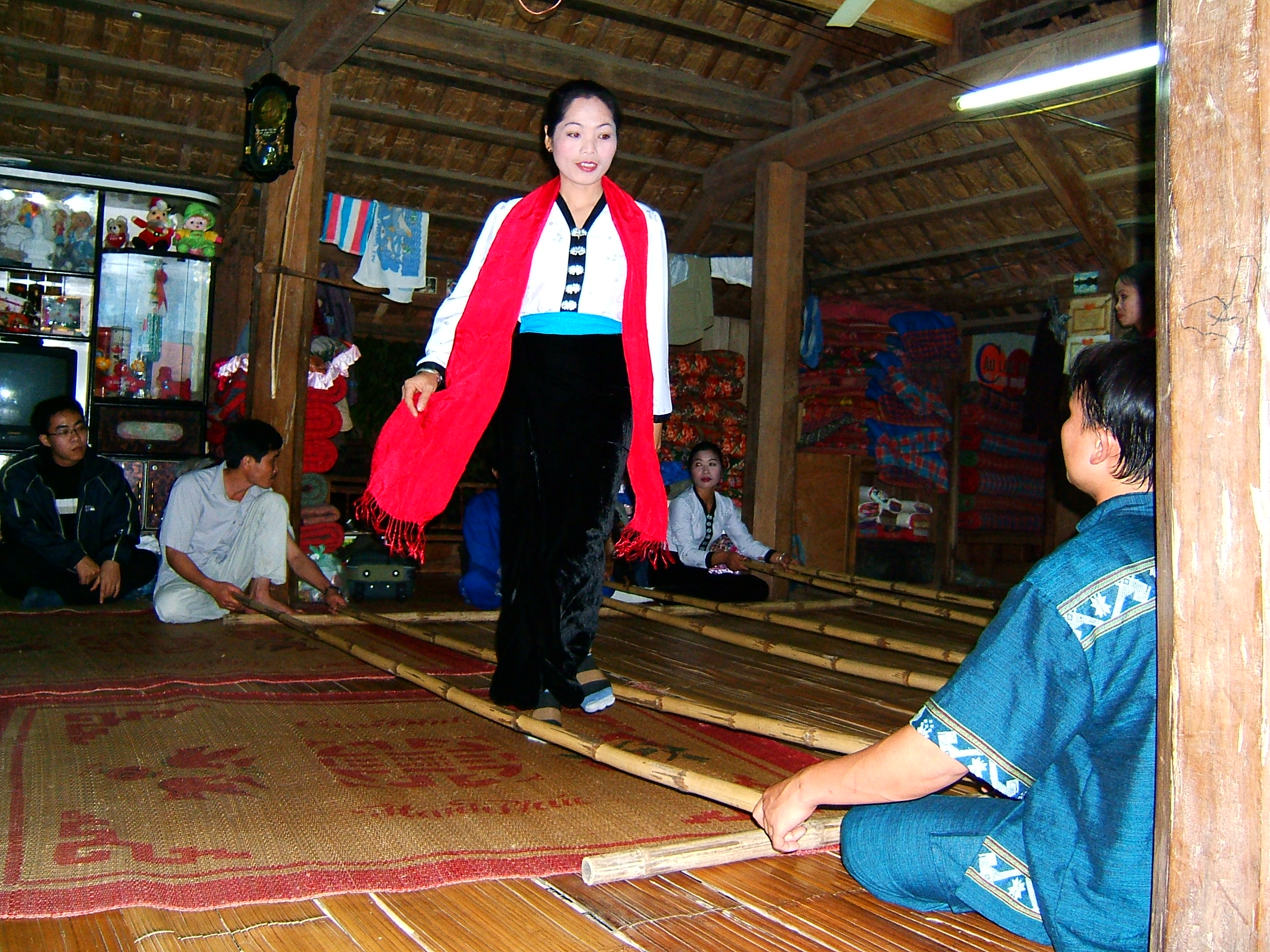
While in Hanoi, teams took part in a traditional Vietnamese bamboo dance known as múa sạp.

- Episode 5: "Your Tan Is Totally Cool" (March 17, 2013)
- Prize: A trip for two to Whistler, British Columbia (awarded to Pam & Winnie)
- Withdrew: Dave & Connor

Locations

- Pecatu (Pura Luhur Uluwatu Cliff)
- Denpasar → Hanoi, Vietnam
- Hanoi (Rạp Công Nhân Theater Gallery 42)
- Hanoi (Công Viên Thống Nhất)
- Hanoi (Temple of Literature or Ngọc Sơn Temple & Hoàn Kiếm District)
- Hanoi (Hữu Tiệp Lake)
- Hanoi (National Museum of Vietnamese History)

Episode summary

- At the start of this leg, teams were instructed to fly to Hanoi, Vietnam. Once there, teams had to travel to the Rạp Công Nhân Theater Gallery 42 in order to find their next clue.
- In this leg's Roadblock, one team member had to watch a performance of a Vietnamese patriotic song. After the performance, the performers revealed the phrase "Vinh quang thay thế hệ thanh niên chúng ta" ("Glory to our young generation") to the racers, who then had five minutes to search a nearby gallery for one of several political posters with the correct phrase in order to receive their next clue. If team members were unable to identify the correct poster within the allotted time, they had to watch the performance again.
- After the Roadblock, teams had to travel to Công Viên Thống Nhất, where they had to correctly complete a traditional Vietnamese bamboo dance known as múa sạp in order to receive their next clue.
- This leg's Detour was a choice between Make Your Move or Make Your Meal. In Make Your Move, teams had to set up a human chessboard at the Temple of Literature. Using a local cờ tướng board as a reference, teams had to find four human chess pieces and then set them up with four staffs in position on the human chessboard in order to receive their next clue. In Make Your Meal, teams had to pick up four baskets (which included two live chickens) at the Ngọc Sơn Temple, and then navigate the street market to find the rest of the ingredients on a shopping list. Teams then had to find a cooking station to cook two phở soups in order to receive their next clue.
- After the Detour, teams had to travel to the downed B-52 at Hữu Tiệp Lake in order to find their next clue, which directed them to the Pit Stop: the National Museum of Vietnamese History.

Additional notes

- Dave & Connor chose to withdraw from the race at the start of the leg and went directly to the Pit Stop after arriving in Hanoi. There was no additional elimination at the end of this leg.
- This leg featured a Double U-Turn. Pam & Winnie chose to use the U-Turn on Joey & Meghan, while Joey & Meghan chose to use the U-Turn on Chuck & Wynona.

=== Leg 6 (Vietnam → Botswana) ===
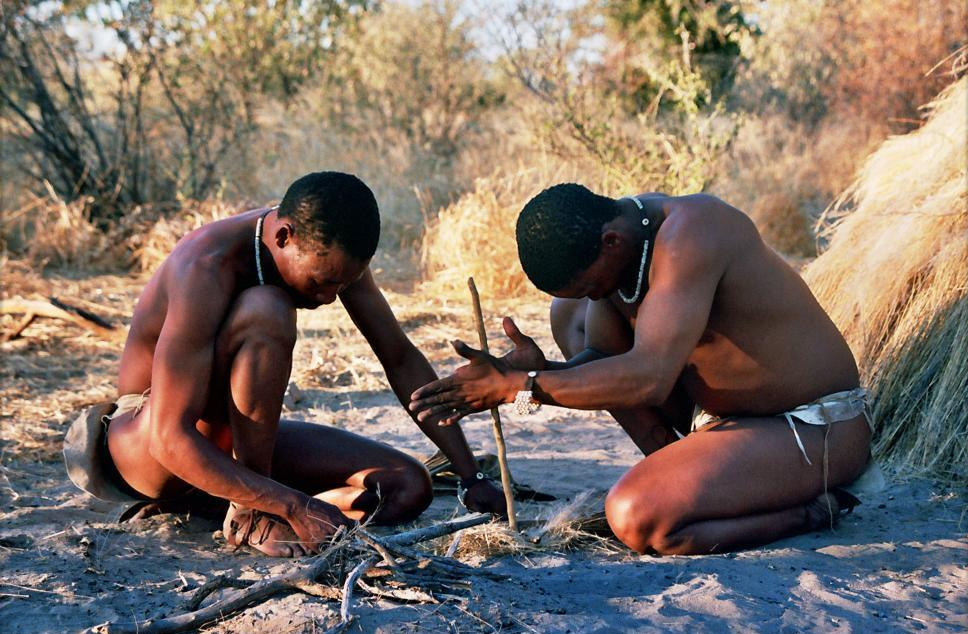
While in Botswana, teams experienced the cultural practices of the Bushmen.

- Episode 6: "Scorpion King Hunter" (March 24, 2013)
- Prize: A trip for two to Phuket, Thailand (awarded to Bates & Anthony)

Locations

- Hanoi (Hanoi Opera House)
- Hanoi (Hair of the Dog) (Unaired)
- Hanoi (Hapro Travel)
- Hanoi → Maun, Botswana
- Maun (Maun Airport – Mack Air Office)
- Maun → Makgadikgadi Pans National Park (Xhumaga Airstrip)
- Makgadikgadi Pans National Park (Old Xhumaga Road)
- Makgadikgadi Pans National Park (Meno A Kwena Safari Camp)

Episode summary

- At the start of this leg, teams were simply instructed to travel to Maun, and they had to figure out that the city was in Botswana. They had to identify the country to a security guard at Hapro Travel before they could enter to purchase their tickets. Once in Maun, teams had to find the Mack Air office, sign up for one of four charter flights to the Makgadikgadi Pans National Park, and retrieve their next clue at the Xhumaga Airstrip. Teams then had to drive down Old Xhumaga Road to their next clue.
- Before the Roadblock, teams chose a group of Kalahari Bushmen, who accompanied them for the rest of this leg. In this leg's Roadblock, one team member had to follow the Bushmen to a hole, where they were taught how to dig up a scorpion and place it in a jar before they could retrieve their next clue.
- After the Roadblock, teams had to drive their group of Bushmen to their next clue.
- This leg's Detour was a choice between Fire or Fowl. In Fire, teams traveled with their Bushmen to a nearby village, where they had to learn how to properly make fire using two sticks, zebra manure, and grass. Once they had a flame, they had to use it to light the elder Bushman's pipe in order to receive their next clue. In Fowl, teams had to learn how to set up a trap in order to catch a guineafowl. After setting up the trap properly, teams had to mimic a guineafowl and get captured in the trap before receiving their next clue.
- After the Detour, teams had to check in at the Pit Stop: the Meno A Kwena Safari Camp.

Additional notes

- Before leaving Vietnam, teams had to travel to the Hair of the Dog bar, where they received their next clue from a dancer. This task was unaired.
- This was a non-elimination leg.

=== Leg 7 (Botswana) ===
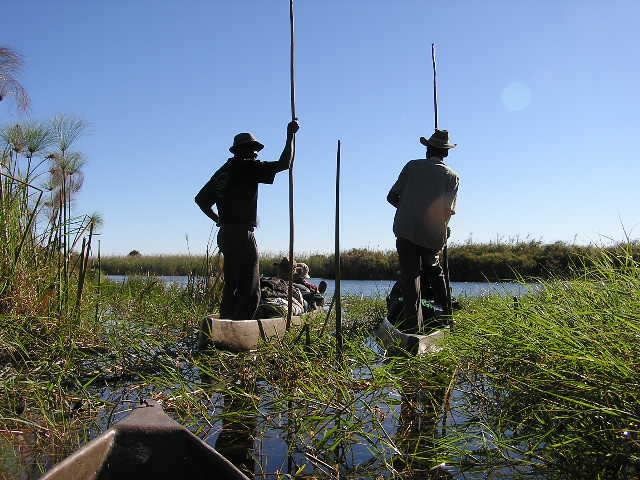
The second Roadblock in Botswana had racers punting makoro canoes to navigate part of the Okavango Delta.

- Episode 7: "Be Safe and Don't Hit a Cow" (March 31, 2013)
- Prize: US$7,500 each (awarded to Bates & Anthony)
- Eliminated: Pam & Winnie

Locations

- Makgadikgadi Pans National Park (Meno A Kwena Safari Camp)
- Maun (Boro Village – Makoro Polling Station)
- Maun (Royal Tree Lodge Game Preserve)

Episode summary

- At the start of this leg, teams had to return to Maun and find the Makoro Polling Station.
- In this season's only Fast Forward, one team had to water ski for over a mile on the Okavango Delta. Bates & Anthony won the Fast Forward.
- For their Speed Bump, Max & Katie had to complete a traditional beaded skirt and then wear it while performing a ceremonial dance before they could continue racing.
- In this leg's Roadblock, one team member had to transport two goats down river to a delivery point using a makoro, a traditional dugout canoe. They had to punt the makoro while their partner looked after the goats. Once the goats were delivered and the teams returned to the starting point, they received their next clue.
- After the Roadblock, teams had to take a safari taxi along the Thamalakane River to the Royal Tree Lodge Game Preserve, where they found their next clue.
- This leg's Detour was a choice between Brains or Brawn. In Brains, teams had to go on a horseback safari and spot ten wooden animal cutouts. They then traveled to a nearby campsite and had to arrange a set of tiles featuring the silhouettes of the animals in the order that they had appeared. Once they had the tiles in the correct order, they received their next clue; if not, they had to go back to the safari before being allowed another attempt. In Brawn, teams had to fill a traditional sand sledge with firewood and then coax a team of donkeys to pull the sledge to a campsite, where they had to unload the wood in order to receive their next clue.
- After the Detour, teams had to search the game preserve for the Pit Stop.

Additional note

- Max and Jennifer were both issued speeding tickets by the Botswana Police Service. Botswanan law required that tickets be paid before the end of the day, so both teams had to pay their fines before they could continue racing.

=== Leg 8 (Botswana → Switzerland) ===
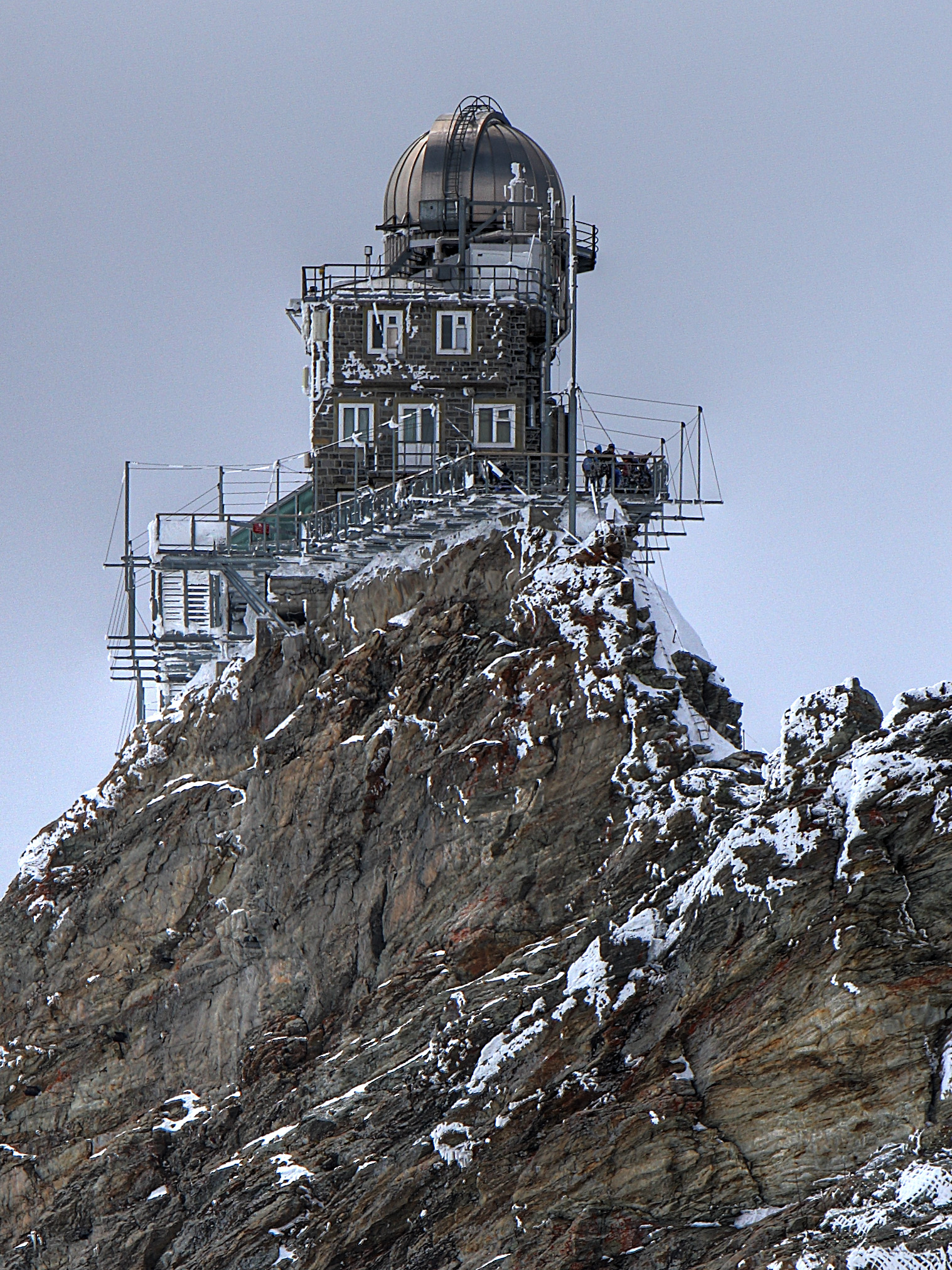
Teams visited the Sphinx Observatory at the top of Switzerland's Jungfraujoch, one of the highest observatories in the world, on this leg.

- Episode 8: "My Cheese Is Out of Control" (April 14, 2013)
- Prize: A trip for two to Bora Bora, French Polynesia (awarded to Bates & Anthony)
- Eliminated: Chuck & Wynona

Locations

- Maun (Royal Tree Lodge Game Preserve)
- Maun → Zürich, Switzerland (Zürich Airport)
- Zürich → Grindelwald
- Grindelwald (Kirche Grindelwald)
- Grindelwald → Kleine Scheidegg
- Kleine Scheidegg (Hotel Bellevue des Alpes)
- Kleine Scheidegg → Jungfraujoch
- Jungfraujoch (Sphinx Observatory)
- Jungfraujoch → Eiger
- Eiger (North Face)
- Eiger → Grindelwald
- Grindelwald (Lütschine Brüggli Bridge)
- Grindelwald (Bodmi Snowboard and Ski School)

Episode summary

- At the start of this leg, teams were instructed to fly to Zürich, Switzerland. At the Zürich Airport, teams had to search for a conductor in a red hat, who handed them their next clue, which directed teams to travel by train to Grindelwald. Once there, teams had to wait at Kirche Grindelwald for an Alpine shepherd, who delivered them their next clue. Teams were instructed to travel by train to Kleine Scheidegg. At the Hotel Bellevue des Alpes, teams had to pick up a "Swiss rescue companion": a St. Bernard. Teams then had to travel with the dog to the Jungfraujoch and deliver the dog to a mountain rescue guide. They were then allowed to search the Sphinx Observatory for their next clue.
- In this leg's Roadblock, one team member had to traverse the north face of the Eiger and pick up a Travelocity Roaming Gnome before traversing back to the railway station's observation deck.
- After the Roadblock, teams had to return by train to Grindelwald and then travel on foot to the Lütschine Brüggli Bridge. There, teams had to follow the sound of a Swiss alphorn to their next clue. Teams then had to participate in a Switchback from season 14, where they had to use traditional sleds to transport a total of four 50-pound (23 kg) wheels of cheese downhill to a barn in order to receive their next clue, which directed them to the Pit Stop: the Bodmi Snowboard and Ski School.

=== Leg 9 (Switzerland → Germany) ===
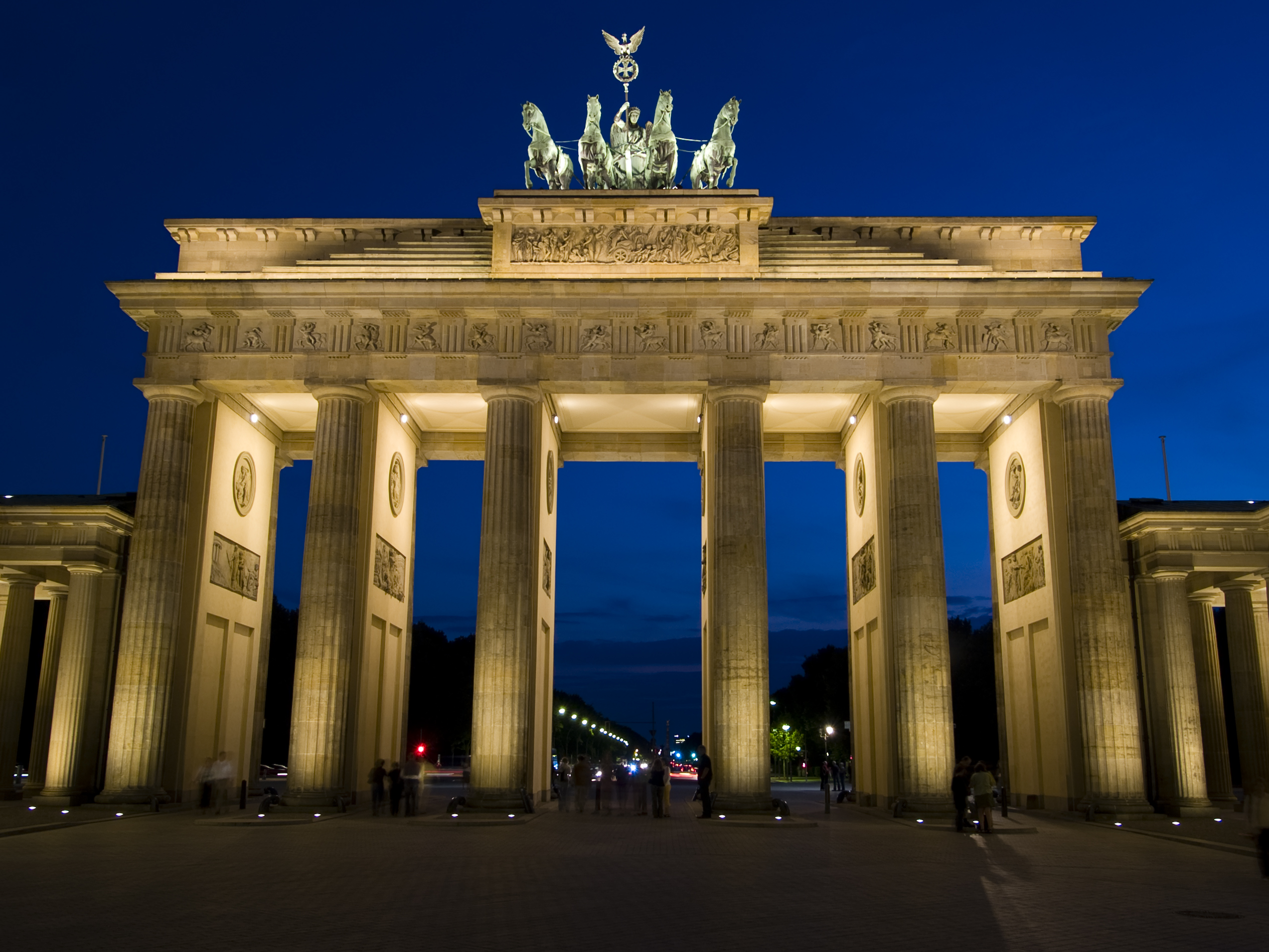
After arriving in Berlin, teams found their next clue at the Brandenburg Gate.

- Episode 9: "The Ultimate Fun House" (April 21, 2013)
- Prize: A 2013 Ford Fusion for each racer (awarded to Max & Katie)

Locations

- Interlaken (Funny Farm Backpackers)
- Interlaken → Basel
- Basel → Dresden, Germany
- Dresden (Saxon State Ministry of Finance)
- Berlin (Brandenburg Gate)
- Berlin (Alexanderplatz – Park Inn Berlin)
- Berlin (Deutsches Technikmuseum or Wasserturm Park & Buchstabenmuseum)
- Berlin (Salon Zur Wilden Renate)
- Berlin (Kurfürstendamm – Joachimsthaler Platz)

Episode summary

- At the start of this leg, teams were instructed to travel by train to Basel and then fly to Dresden, Germany. At the Saxon State Ministry of Finance in Dresden, teams had to answer three questions in order to receive their next destination: 1) Who said "Tear down this wall!"? (Ronald Reagan); 2) Who did he say it to? (Mikhail Gorbachev); and 3) Where did President Reagan say it? (the Brandenburg Gate in Berlin). After finding their next clue at the Brandenburg Gate, teams were directed to the Park Inn Berlin, where both teams members had to perform a BASE jump from the roof in order to receive their next clue.
- This leg's Detour was a choice between Train Trials or Font Follies. In Train Trials, teams drove to the Deutsches Technikmuseum, where they had to build a model train track using all of the provided pieces such that the track fit on a platform. Once the train was able to make one full lap without derailing or hitting any of the scenery, teams received their next clue. In Font Follies, teams had to travel to Wasserturm Park. There, they picked up two large neon alphabet letters and had to transport them intact on foot to the Buchstabenmuseum in order to receive their next clue.
- After the Detour, teams had to drive to Salon Zur Wilden Renate, where they found their next clue.
- In this leg's Roadblock, one team member first had to answer a question – Who said "Ich bin ein Berliner"? (John F. Kennedy) – and then enter a labyrinth beneath the nightclub, where they had to search for a white room that held their next clue, which directed them to the Pit Stop: Joachimsthaler Platz on Kurfürstendamm.

Additional note

- This was a non-elimination leg.

=== Leg 10 (Germany → Scotland) ===
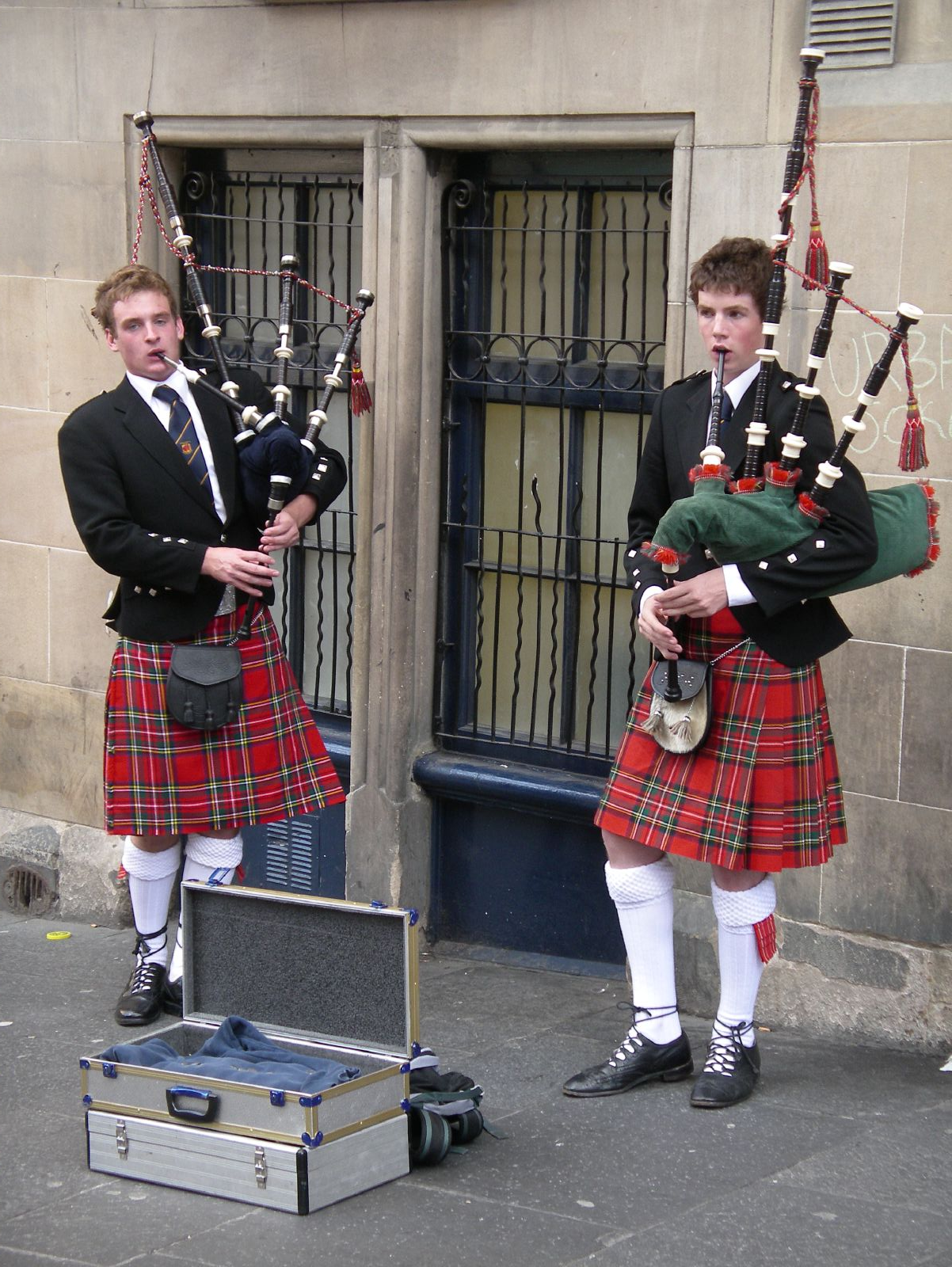
After arriving in Edinburgh, the Roadblock had one team member playing Scotland's traditional musical instrument, the bagpipes, with marching pipers.

- Episode 10: "Working Our Barrels Off" (April 28, 2013)
- Prize: US$10,000 each (awarded to Max & Katie)
- Eliminated: Joey & Meghan

Locations

- Berlin (InterContinental Berlin)
- Berlin → Edinburgh, Scotland
- Longniddry (Gosford House)
- Edinburgh (Craigmillar Castle)
- Edinburgh (Duddingston – Sheep Heid Inn)
- Edinburgh (Duddingston – Sheep Heid Inn or Alleyway)
- Edinburgh (Duddingston – Duddingston Kirk)
- Edinburgh (Old Town – Niddry Street South)

Episode summary

- At the start of this leg, teams were instructed to fly to Edinburgh, Scotland. Once there, teams had to drive themselves to Gosford House in Longniddry, where they found their next clue.
- In this leg's Roadblock, one team member had to dress in a Royal Scots regiment uniform and learn to continuously play a drone on a set of bagpipes while marching with the Royal Scots pipers in Gosford House's Marble Room for two minutes in order to receive their next clue.
- After the Roadblock, teams had to drive to Craigmillar Castle and search the castle's fireplaces for their next clue.
- For their Speed Bump, Mona & Beth had to play a game of skittles, a traditional British form of ten-pin bowling, and score a strike before they could continue racing.
- This leg's Detour was a choice between Tasty Puddin' or Whiskey Rollin'. In Tasty Puddin', teams had to prepare haggis by filling ox intestines with oatmeal in the presence of a Robert Burns impersonator, who recited Burns' poem "Address to a Haggis". Once each team member prepared four portions of haggis and had a taste, they were given their next clue. In Whiskey Rollin', teams had to roll eight barrels of Scotch whisky up a slope and deliver them to a party in order to receive their next clue.
- After the Detour, teams had to travel on foot to Duddingston Kirk in order to find their next clue, which directed them to the Pit Stop: Niddry Street South in Edinburgh's Old Town.

Additional note

- This leg featured a Double U-Turn. Bates & Anthony chose to use the U-Turn on Joey & Meghan, while Max & Katie chose to use the U-Turn on Mona & Beth.

=== Leg 11 (Scotland → Northern Ireland) ===
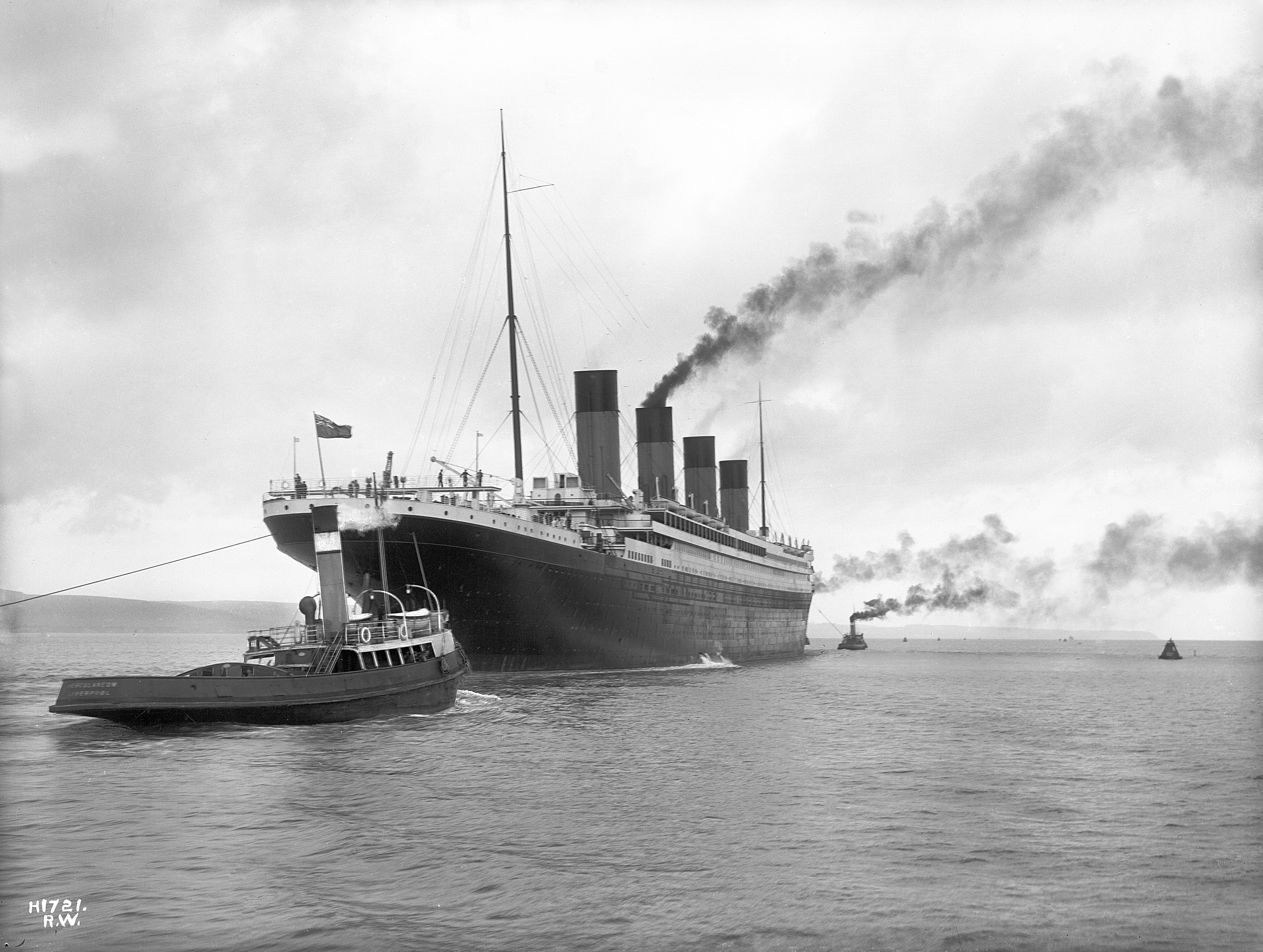
One of the Detour choices in Northern Ireland paid tribute to the RMS Titanic, where teams had a task in Belfast's Titanic Quarter dry dock, the place it had been built.

- Episode 11: "Beacon of Hope" (May 5, 2013)
- Prize: A trip for two to Punta Cana, Dominican Republic (awarded to Max & Katie)
- Eliminated: Caroline & Jennifer

Locations

- Edinburgh (Johnston Terrace)
- Edinburgh → Stranraer
- Cairnryan → Belfast, Northern Ireland
- Belfast (All-Route Shipping Warehouse)
- County Armagh (Peatlands Park)
- Belfast (Thanksgiving Square – Beacon of Hope)
- Belfast (Titanic Quarter – Titanic's Dock & Pump House or T13 Skate Park)
- Belfast (Ulster Hall)

Episode summary

- At the start of this leg, teams were instructed to travel by train to Stranraer and then by ferry to Belfast, Northern Ireland. Once there, teams had to travel on foot to the All-Route Shipping Warehouse and then drive to Peatlands Park in order to find their next clue.
- In this leg's Roadblock, one team member had to participate in bog snorkeling. After donning full snorkeling gear, they had to cannonball into a muddy pool, and then swim one lap in the bog within four minutes in order to receive their next clue.
- After the Roadblock, teams had to find "The Thing With a Ring", which they had to figure out was the Beacon of Hope sculpture in Thanksgiving Square and where they found their next clue.
- This season's final Detour was a choice between Tray It or Spray It. In Tray It, teams had to go to the drydock where the Titanic was built and serve the ship's last five-course dinner to a group of first-class passengers. Using the provided menu and a seating chart, teams had to choose the proper dishes for each course from a table full of plates and serve them to the passengers in the dining room. When the waiter was satisfied that each passenger received the correct dish for each course, the team was allowed to move on to the next course. Once all five courses were served correctly, teams received their next clue from a Captain Edward Smith impersonator. In Spray It, teams had to go to a skate park in a warehouse, where they had to finish half of a graffiti painting using a photograph as reference in order to receive their next clue.
- After the Detour, teams had to check in at the Pit Stop: Ulster Hall.

=== Leg 12 (Northern Ireland → England → United States) ===
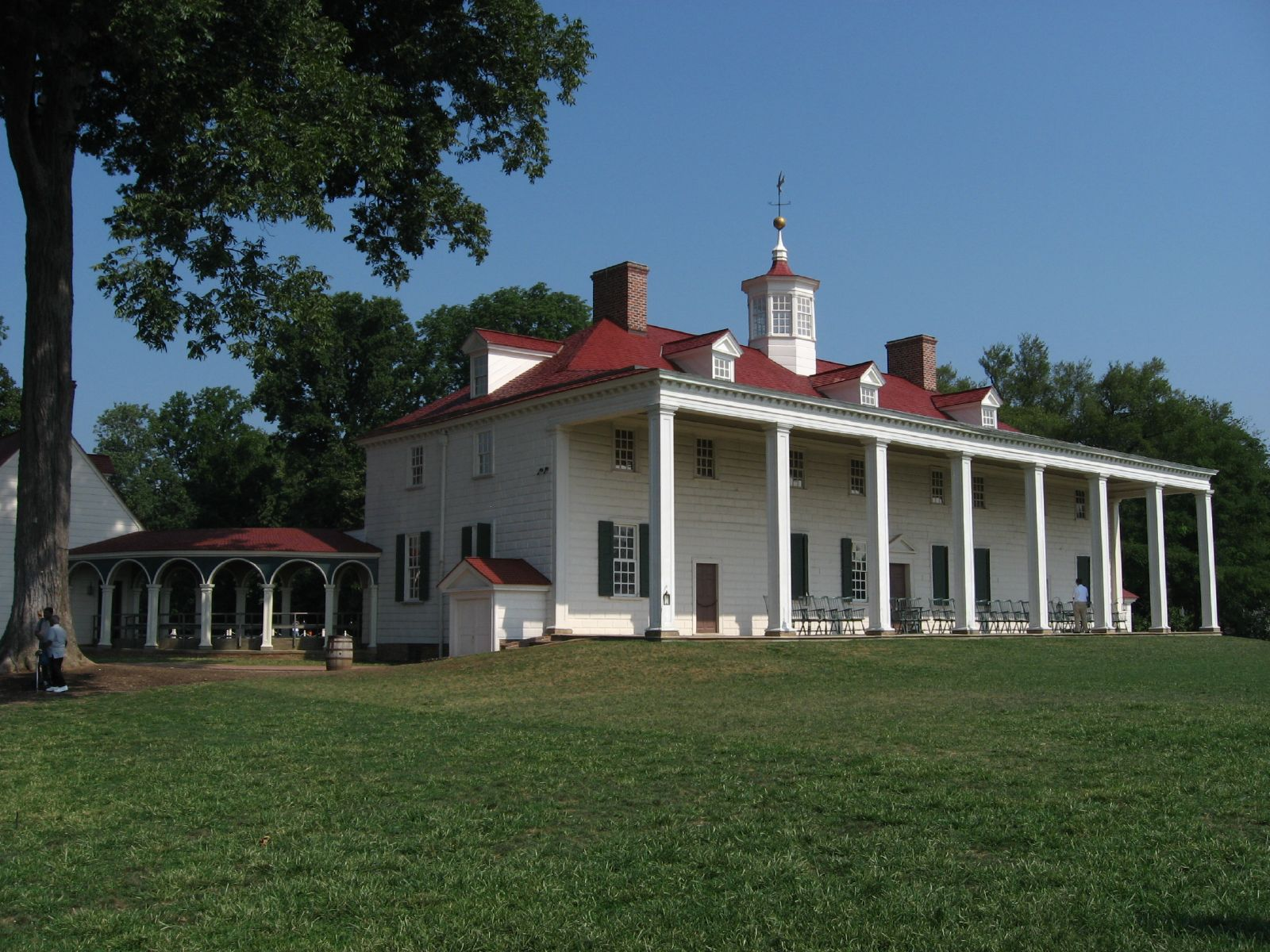
Mount Vernon, the estate of George Washington, was the site of the finish line for The Amazing Race 22.

- Episode 11: "Beacon of Hope" (May 5, 2013)
- Prize: US$1,000,000
- Winners: Bates & Anthony
- Second Place: Max & Katie
- Third Place: Mona & Beth

Locations

- Belfast (Ulster Hall)
- Belfast → Birkenhead, England
- Liverpool → London
- London (Euston Tap)
- London → Washington, D.C.
- Washington, D.C. (Lincoln Memorial)
- Washington, D.C. (1100 Pennsylvania Avenue – Old Post Office Pavilion)
- Washington, D.C. (West Potomac Park – Tidal Basin)
- Washington, D.C. (Nationals Park)
- Washington, D.C. (Hains Point)
- Mount Vernon, Virginia (Mount Vernon)

Episode summary

- At the start of this leg, teams were instructed to travel by ferry to Birkenhead, England, and then by train to London. Once there, teams had to travel to the Euston Tap, where they each had to order a pint of beer before they were given their next clue, which instructed them to fly to Washington, D.C.
- After arriving in Washington, D.C., teams had to find the location where Martin Luther King Jr. gave his "I Have a Dream" speech: the steps of the Lincoln Memorial. Teams were directed to 1100 Pennsylvania Avenue, where they were escorted by "Secret Service agents" who told them that they were to have their photograph taken with President Barack Obama. They were taken to a souvenir photography studio where they posed for a photograph in which their face was superimposed meeting President Obama with their next clue printed on the back. Teams then traveled to the Tidal Basin, where they had to search for a marked car near the paddleboat docks. After knocking on the rear window, the car's occupant gave them a briefcase along with their next clue.
- This season's final Roadblock was a Switchback from season 8. One team member had to take the briefcase and find one of fifty "spies" around the Tidal Basin who responded to their given code phrase with another supplied code phrase – Max: "Where can I get a good half-smoke with chili?" ("I've heard there's a great place on U Street."); Bates: "I did not dress warm enough for this weather." ("Perhaps you would like to borrow my gloves."); Beth: "The cherry blossoms are beautiful here in April." ("I'll have to bring my mother next spring."). They then swapped briefcases with the spy, who told them that the combination to open their new briefcase was their final placement in New Zealand (Leg 3), Indonesia (Leg 4), and Vietnam (Leg 5). After they unlocked their briefcase, they could retrieve their next clue inside.
- After the Roadblock, teams were instructed to travel to "The Home of the Nats": Nationals Park. There, one team member had to ride a zip-line across the stadium and toss a baseball while their partner, dressed as a baseball, attempted to catch it. Once they successfully caught the ball, they could see that it had "Hains Point" written on it, which was their next destination. There, one team member had to enter a giant ball pit filled with globes and find ten globes marked with the countries that they visited on the race (excluding England). They had to pass the globes to their partner, who placed the globes in chronological order. Once they had all of their globes in the correct order, a giant globe opened and revealed the teams' final clue. Teams were instructed to travel to "The Home of the First President", which they had to figure out was the home of George Washington: Mount Vernon.

Country	Outline
French Polynesia	
New Zealand	
Indonesia	
Vietnam	
Botswana	
Switzerland	
Germany	
Scotland	
Northern Ireland	
United States	

Additional notes

- At Nationals Park, after the team member on the ground caught the ball, they had to toss the ball to a pitcher, who pitched it to a batter, who then hit it into the outfield. The team member on the ground had to retrieve the ball before reuniting with their partner. This aspect of the task was unaired.
- Legs 11 and 12 aired back-to-back as a special two-hour episode.

== Reception ==
=== Critical response ===
The Amazing Race 22 receive mixed-to-negative reviews. Daniel Fienberg of HitFix wrote that "this wasn't an awful 'Amazing Race' season, but it was a season without a grand, building narrative." Scott Von Doviak of The A.V. Club wrote that "it really isn't [amazing] and hasn't been for a long time. It's just coasting along on inertia at this point, and apparently Bertram van Munster and company don't feel the need to shake it up much at all." Michael Hewitt of the Orange County Register was positive during the early part of the season but negative towards the end saying that the disappointing finish was "spoiling what had been a competitive revival for the show." Daron Aldridge of Box Office Prophets called it a "meh" season. In 2016, this season was ranked 20th out of the first 27 seasons by the Rob Has a Podcast Amazing Race correspondents. In 2024, Rhenn Taguiam of Game Rant placed this season within the bottom 13 out of 36.

=== Depictions of communist imagery ===
The episode in Hanoi sparked ire among some conservative media analysts and viewers for the tasks involving a performance of a communist propaganda song and the brief visit to a B-52 bomber that was shot down by North Vietnamese forces during the Vietnam War and turned into a memorial for communist Vietnam's victory. Complaints came in from sources such as the national commanders of the American Legion and VFW, and Democratic strategist and Fox News pundit Bob Beckel also spoke of his disgust at the program's choices. Yahoo! later reported on comments from viewers found on Twitter whose complaints ranged from threatening to no longer watch the series or statements that the episode was "strange" or "disrespectful to Americans killed [in Vietnam]".

Prior to the start of the episode for leg 6, CBS aired an apology, noting that portions of the previous episode were insensitive to U.S. Armed Forces veterans. The message, read by host Phil Keoghan, stated:

"Parts of last Sunday's episode, filmed in Vietnam, were insensitive to a group that is very important to us – our nation's veterans. We want to apologize to veterans – particularly those who served in Vietnam – as well as to their families and any viewers who were offended by the broadcast. All of us here have the most profound respect for the men and women who fight for our country."

=== Ratings ===
No episode aired on April 7, 2013, due to CBS and CTV's broadcasts of the Academy of Country Music Awards.

U.S. Nielsen ratings

#	Airdate	Episode	Rating	Share	Rating/Share	Viewers	Rank	Rank	Rank	Rank
#	Airdate	Episode	Households		18–49	(millions)	Timeslot (Viewers)	Timeslot (18–49)	Week (Viewers)	Week (18–49)
1	February 17, 2013	"Business in the Front, Party in the Back"	5.5	8	2.5/6	9.57	1	1	13	14
2	February 24, 2013	"Loose Lips Sink Ships"	4.0	6	1.9/4	6.95	2	2 (tie)	<25	<25
3	March 3, 2013	"Like James Bond Again"	5.4	8	2.5/6	9.24	1	1	15	15
4	March 10, 2013	"I Love Monkeys!"	5.5	9	2.4/7	9.27	1	1	14	13
5	March 17, 2013	"Your Tan Is Totally Cool"	5.3	8	2.3/6	8.91	1	1 (tie)	16	13
6	March 24, 2013	"Scorpion King Hunter"	5.6	8	2.4/6	9.33	1	2	14	17
7	March 31, 2013	"Be Safe and Don't Hit a Cow"	5.6	9	2.3/6	9.24	1	1	14	20
8	April 14, 2013	"My Cheese Is Out of Control"	6.0	9	2.3/6	9.76	1	1 (tie)	19	18
9	April 21, 2013	"The Ultimate Fun House"	5.4	9	2.4/7	9.16	1	1	14	10
10	April 28, 2013	"Working Our Barrels Off"	5.4	9	2.4/7	9.32	1	1	18	14
11	May 5, 2013	"Beacon of Hope"	5.5	9	2.4/7	9.10	1	1	21	18

- Episode 2, "Loose Lips Sink Ships", aired on the same night as the 85th Academy Awards.
- Episode 7, "Be Safe and Don't Hit a Cow", aired on Easter Sunday; the broadcast was subsequently delayed by 41 minutes in the Eastern/Central market due to the 2013 NCAA Men's Division I Basketball Tournament's Midwest Regional and South Regional final matches.
- Episode 8, "My Cheese Is Out of Control", was delayed by 56 minutes in the Eastern/Central market due to the final day of the 2013 Masters golf tournament.

Canadian ratings

Canadian broadcaster CTV also aired The Amazing Race on Sundays. Episodes aired at 8:00 p.m. Eastern and Central (9:00 p.m. Pacific, Mountain and Atlantic), with two exceptions. The broadcast of the second episode conflicted with CTV's broadcast of the 85th Academy Awards; The Amazing Race was shown instead at 8:00 p.m. in the Atlantic time zone, at 7:00 p.m. in the Eastern time zone, and at 6:00 p.m. in the Central time zone, and immediately after the broadcast of the Oscars in the Pacific and Mountain time zones. The broadcast of the ninth episode conflicted with CTV's broadcast of the 2013 Juno Awards; The Amazing Race was instead shown at 7:00 p.m. in each time zone across the country.

#	Airdate	Episode	Viewers (millions)	Rank (Week)
1	February 17, 2013	"Business in the Front, Party in the Back"	2.28	3
2	February 24, 2013	"Loose Lips Sink Ships"	1.83	11
3	March 3, 2013	"Like James Bond Again"	2.45	2
4	March 10, 2013	"I Love Monkeys!"	2.23	4
5	March 17, 2013	"Your Tan Is Totally Cool"	2.50	2
6	March 24, 2013	"Scorpion King Hunter"	2.41	3
7	March 31, 2013	"Be Safe and Don't Hit a Cow"	2.06	3
8	April 14, 2013	"My Cheese Is Out of Control"	2.35	2
9	April 21, 2013	"The Ultimate Fun House"	1.95	3
10	April 28, 2013	"Working Our Barrels Off"	2.40	3
11	May 5, 2013	"Beacon of Hope"	2.12	5
