= Can opener (disambiguation) =

Canopener or can opener, may refer to:

== In general ==
- Can opener (tin opener), a mechanical device used to open tin cans
- Can opener (hold) (spinal lock), a grappling hold
- Can opener (tennis), a type of serve
- Can opener capsulotomy, a medical procedure
- Can opener, a variant of cannonball (diving)

== Transportation ==
- USS John F. Kennedy (CV-67), nicknamed "Can Opener"; a U.S. Navy aircraft carrier
- Supersonic Can Opener, a paint scheme used by the VF-51
- Conrail Can Opener, a paint scheme used on the GE C32-8
- The Can Opener, the Norfolk Southern–Gregson Street Overpass; a railroad bridge in Durham, North Carolina, USA; known for frequent vehicle strikes on the low clearance

== Entertainment ==
- Can Opener (Russian: Консервный нож), a science fiction story by Vasili Golovachov
- "Can Opener", 2016 season 1 episode 7 of MacGyver; see MacGyver (2016 TV series, season 1)
- "The Can Opener", 1999 season 4 episode 2 number 75 of Everybody Loves Raymond; see Everybody Loves Raymond (season 4)
- "Can Opener", a 2009 song by Wallis Bird from the album New Boots
- "Can Opener", a 1992 song by Quicksand from the album Slip (album)
- "The Can Opener", a 1986 track by Robyn Hitchcock and the Egyptians from the album Element of Light
- "Canopener", a 1983 song by the Tall Dwarfs from the EP Canned Music

== Other uses ==
- Can Opener Lake, Ontario, Canada; see List of lakes of Ontario: C
- Can-opener smoothdream, a species of anglerfish

== See also ==
- Assume a can opener, a criticism of oversimplification in hypothesis formulation
- Opener (disambiguation)
- Can (disambiguation)
- Tin (disambiguation)
- tin can
