= Tin (disambiguation) =

Tin is a metallic chemical element with symbol Sn and atomic number 50.

Tin, Tinh or Tins may also refer to:

== Science and technology ==
=== Metallurgy ===
- Tin or tin can, a sealed tinplate container
- Tin box, an openable tinplate container
- Tin, a metal area of the wall in a squash court

=== Acronyms and software ===
- Titanium nitride (TiN), an extremely hard ceramic compound
- Tin (newsreader), a software application to read Usenet newsgroups on Unix operating systems

== Arts and entertainment ==
- Tin, a member of the Metal Men superheroes
- Tins (film), a 2007 film
- The Tins, an American indie rock band

== Other uses ==
- Tin, also known as Tinh or Tins, the Etruscan supreme god
- Tỉnh, the Vietnamese word for province

== See also ==
- At-Tin, the 95th sura of the Qur'an
- Sn (disambiguation)
- TIN (disambiguation)
- Tinn (disambiguation)
- Tinne (disambiguation)
- Tintin (disambiguation), including Tin Tin
