= TIN =

TIN may refer to:

- Taxpayer Identification Number, used for tax purposes in the United States
- Tindouf Airport (IATA code), in Tindouf, Algeria
- Titanium nitride (TiN), a ceramic material
- Triangulated irregular network, a geometric data structure

== See also ==
- Tin, a metal
- Tin (disambiguation)
