= Tinn =

Tinn may refer to:

== Places ==
- Tinn Municipality, a municipality in Telemark county, Norway
- Tinn prestegjeld, a former geographic subdivision of the Church of Norway in Telemark county
- Lake Tinn, a lake in Telemark county, Norway

== People ==
- Tinn Isriyanet (born 1993), a Thai badminton player
- Eduard Tinn (1899–1968), an Estonian actor and theatre director
- Jack Tinn (1878–1971), an English football manager
- James Tinn (1922–1999), a British Labour Party politician
- Olev Tinn (1920–1971), an Estonian actor
- Tinn (musician), a Brazilian singer-songwriter and record producer

== See also ==
- Tin
- Tinne
