= Tinne (surname) =

Tinne (Dutch pronunciation: [ˈtɪnə]) is a Dutch surname. Notable people with this surname include:

- Alexine Tinne (1835–1869), Dutch explorer and photographer
- Emily Tinne (1886–1966), British collector of clothes
- John Tinne (1877–1933), British politician
- Philippe Frédéric Tinne or Philip Frederick Tinne (18 November 1772-27 July 1844), Dutch businessman and slave-owner in Demerara; partner in Sandbach, Tinne & Company

== See also ==
- Tinne (disambiguation)
