= Opener =

Opener, Open'er or Openers may refer to:

- Opener (album), an album by 8mm
- Opener (baseball), a baseball strategy to use a relief pitcher to start a game
- Open'er Festival, a contemporary music festival held in Gdynia, Poland
- Bottle opener
- Can opener
- Conversation opener
- Opener, cricket player at the start of the batting order
- Openers, first poetry book from Roky Erickson, later followed by Openers II

== See also ==
- Opening act, a performance by an introductory group prior to the main act
