= Piti Aau =

Island in French Polynesia

Coordinates: 16.525°S 151.703°W

Piti Aau Island
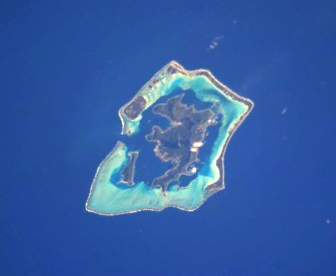
- The Bora Bora Group.
- Interactive map of Piti Aau Island

Geography
- Location: Pacific Ocean
- Archipelago: Society Islands
- Area: 2.25 km^{2} (0.87 sq mi)
- Highest elevation: 20 m (70 ft)
- Highest point: Reva Reva Hill

Administration
- France
- Commune: Bora Bora Commune
- Island Group: Bora Bora
- Largest settlement: Taurere (pop. 35 inhabitants)

Demographics
- Population: 50 (2016)
- Pop. density: 22/km^{2} (57/sq mi)

Motu Piti Aau is a 2.25 km^{2} (0.9 sq mi) island in the Bora Bora Islands Group, within the Society Islands of French Polynesia. It is located between Pitiuu Tai, and Tape.

== Geography ==
Motu Piti Aau is a low island, with a small hill called Reva Reva Hill.

== Administration ==
The island is part of Bora Bora Commune.

== Demographics ==
Taurere, the main village of the island, is on the south west corner, facing Bora Bora Island.

Its current population includes many private households as the some resort staff commute daily to the pier at Eden Beach, while others may use different access points depending on their resort’s location.

== Tourism ==
The Island boasts many resorts.

- Near the island of Tape, is Le Meridien Resort.
- Thalasso Intercontinental Resort
- Eden Beach Resort
- Bora Bora One Resort, near Taurere
- Chez Nono operates a camping facility in Fareone point, at the south of Piti Aau, the cheapest in Bora Bora.

== Transportation ==
After arriving in Fa'a'ā International Airport, an Air Tahiti inter-island flight (50 minutes) will bring you to Bora Bora Airport.

You will need to board the airline’s catamaran shuttle to Vaitape, where resorts staff take boats.
