= Peatlands Park =

Scientific park in Northern Ireland

Coordinates: 54.485°N 6.609°W

Peatlands Park is a 266 hectares area established in 1990 and placed under the safeguard of the Northern Ireland Environment Agency. It is located in County Armagh, Northern Ireland, and has been designated as an Area of Special Scientific Interest (ASSI). Peatlands Park is home to a particularly rich sample of the fauna and flora found in peat bogs, and proposes 16 km (10 mi) of paths to its visitors.

The park holds two natural reserves predating the park itself, Annagarriff (77 ha) and Mullenakill (22ha), established in 1980. Of the two, Annagarriff is thought to be home to the only colony of Scottish wood ants in Ireland.

It also holds a 3 ft (914 mm) narrow gauge railway established in 1901 and displays an outdoor turf-cutting site. The park is also used as a venue for bog snorkelling.

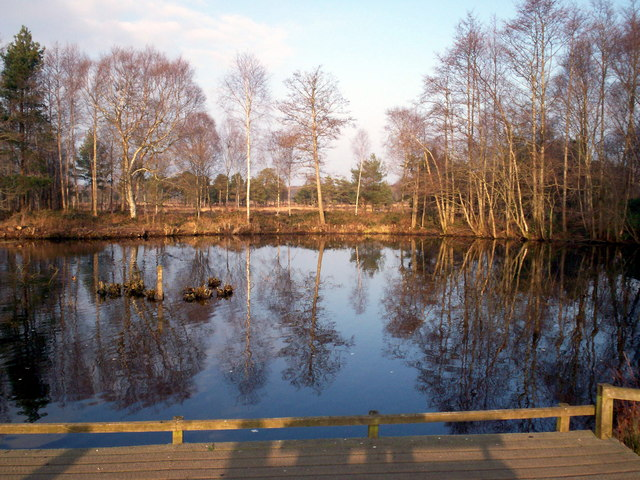
Peatlands Park's main pond in the winter with the bogland beyond the trees.
