= Mute Island =

Small island in French Polynesia

Coordinates: 16.443°S 151.752°W

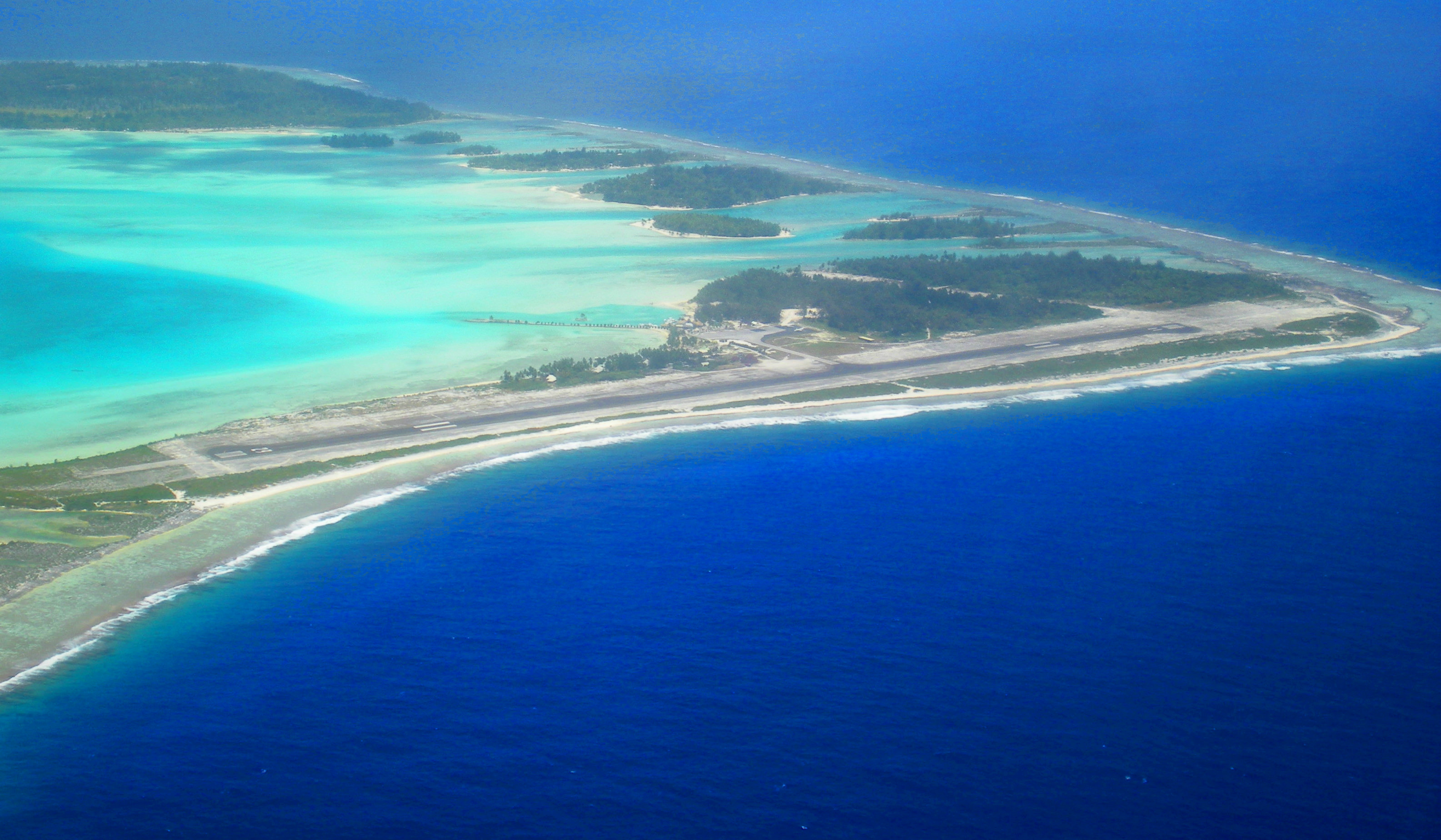
- Mute Island.
- Interactive map of Mute Island

Geography
- Location: Pacific Ocean
- Archipelago: Society Islands
- Area: 1.203 km^{2} (0.464 sq mi)
- Highest elevation: 0 m (0 ft)

Administration
- France
- Commune: Bora Bora Commune
- Island Group: Bora Bora
- Largest settlement: Mute (pop. 2 inhabitants)

Demographics
- Population: 2 (2016)
- Pop. density: 1.66/km^{2} (4.3/sq mi)

Motu Mute is a 1.2 km^{2} (0.46 sq mi) island in the Bora Bora Islands Group, within the Society Islands of French Polynesia. It is the located between Havae and Tooparopae.

== Gallery ==
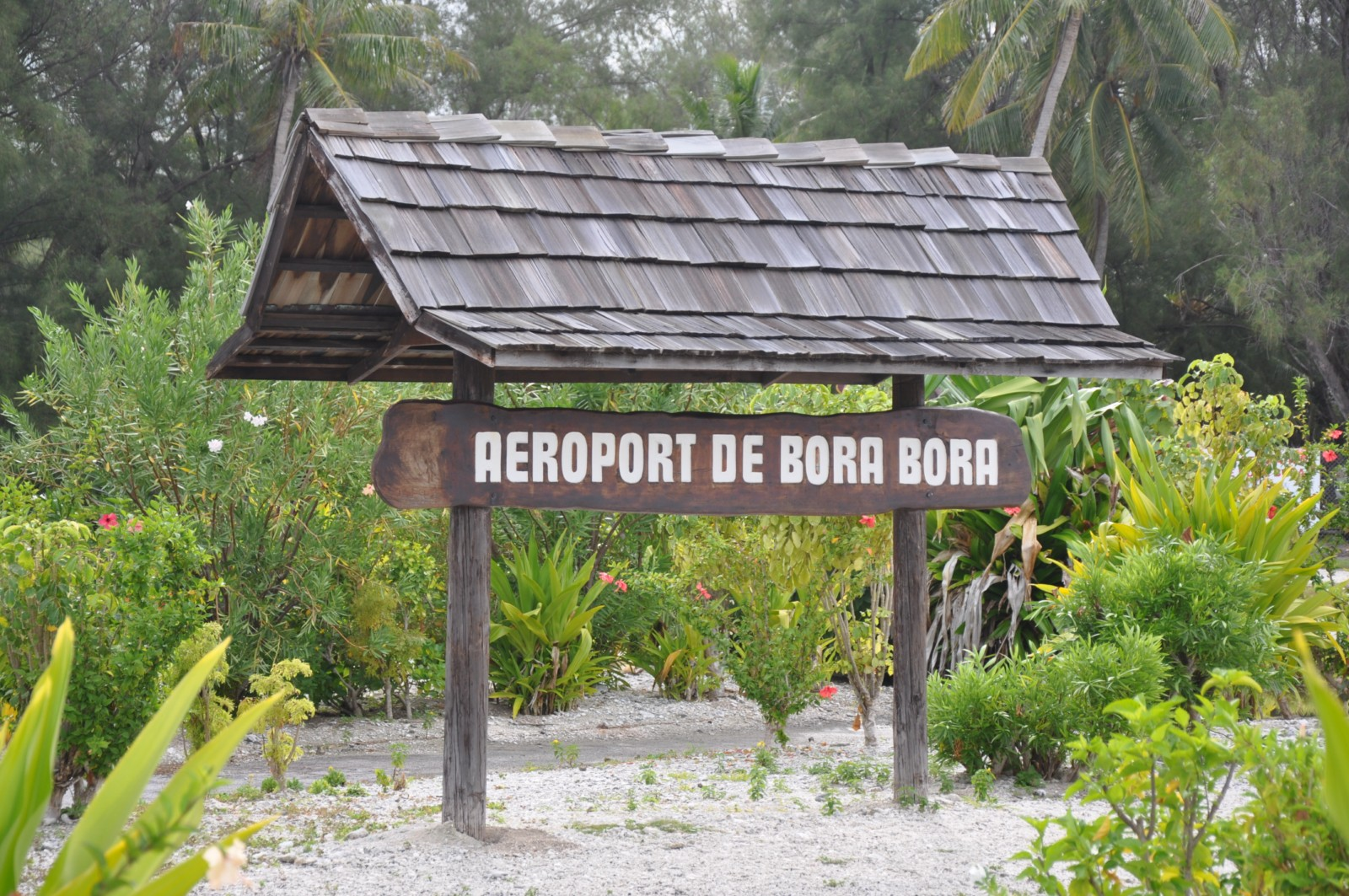
Mute Island

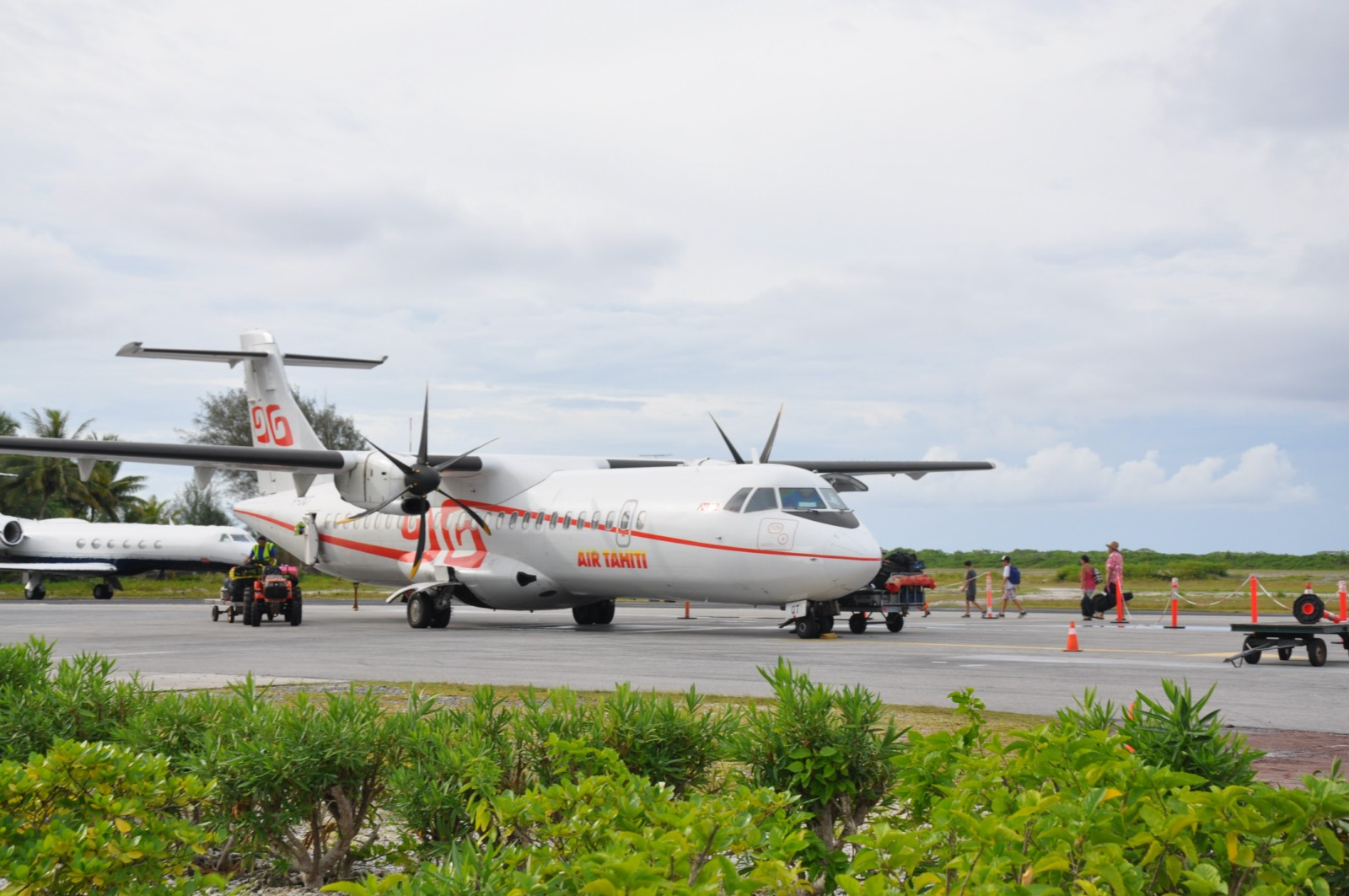
Mute Island

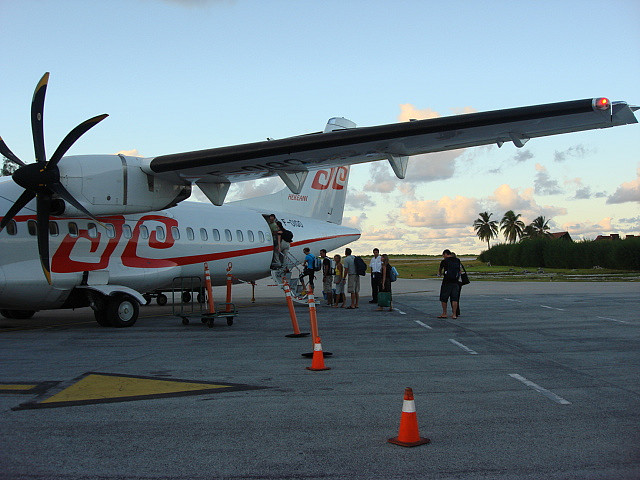
Mute Island
