= Cannonball (diving) =

Type of dive into water

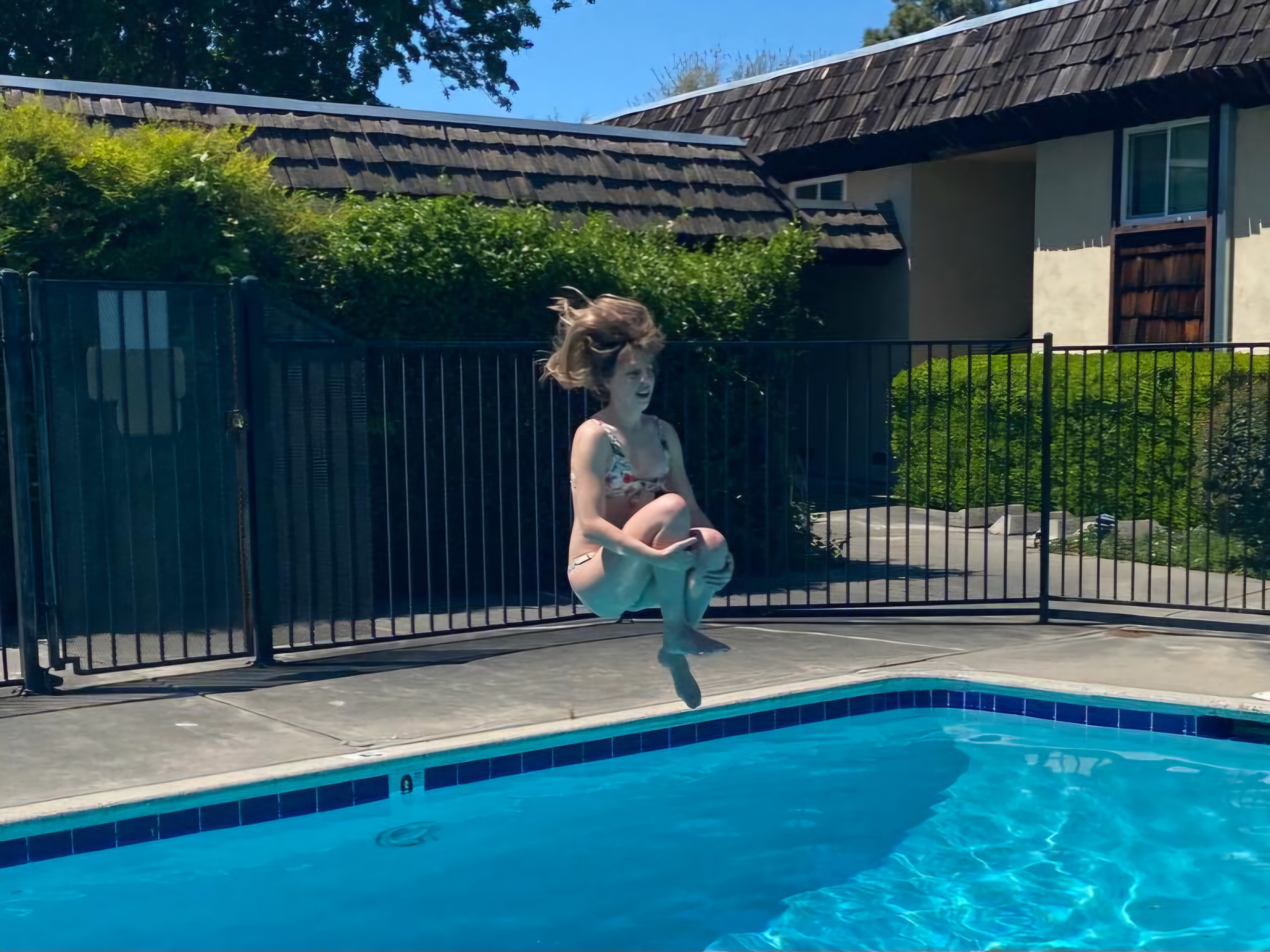
Recreational diver doing a cannonball

A cannonball, also referred to as a bomb, is a diving style where the diver hugs their knees and attempts to enter the water with their body shaped as much like a sphere as possible. The goal is to create a large splash.

Known in German as the Arschbombe (ass bomb), the cannonball has been turned into the competitive sport of "Splashdiving".

In New Zealand, the dive is referred to colloquially as a Manu - a word from the indigenous Māori language.

== Variants ==
- Can opener: a cannonball with one leg extended. This is the standard "bomb" in Australia, involving rocking back at the last minute to trap water under the body for a direction spurt .
- Hammerhead: a cannonball with forward rotation, landing head first.
- Watermelon: a cannonball with forward rotation, landing back first.
- Clanfa Triestina (Triestine Horseshoe): a cannonball with forward rotation, landing parallel to the water. Popular in the Italian city of Trieste in the shallow waters surrounding its coastline.
- Horsey. Into the water with hands and feet extended, toes pointed, pushing water out with the stomach. Fairly popular in Australia but difficult to execute correctly.
- Rabbit. Most popular competitive bomb in Australia. Similar to the Trieste bomb, but diver pulls legs in and clutches with arms at last moment. This often is done from a considerable height, and can send a narrow spurt of water with accuracy even higher than the dive point. Requires daring and skill.
- Chinaman. Arms and legs crossed, leaning back about 30 degrees. By trapping water under the arched back, the bomber can make a very substantial splash even from a pool edge, for heavier proponents.
- Manu. Falling into the water and forming a "V" shape. And right as you hit the water, start leaning your back down. This causes a huge splash!
- Sui/Suicide. Jumping into the water and having your hands hit the water first. Looks like a cannonball, but upside down. And when you hit the water, start untucking to make a big splash.
- Coffin*. Like a Can Opener, but both legs extended. And arms crossed onto chest.
