= Tinne =

Tinne may refer to:

== People ==
- Tinne (name), Germanic female given name
- Tinne (surname), Dutch surname

== Places ==
- Tinne, or Tinnåa, a river in Telemark county, Norway
- 16676 Tinne, minor planet

== Other ==
- Tinne (letter), the Irish name of the eighth letter of the Ogham alphabet
