= List of listed buildings in Jura, Argyll and Bute =

This is a list of listed buildings in the parish of Jura in Argyll and Bute, Scotland.

== List ==
Name	Location	Date Listed	Grid Ref. (Note: Sometimes known as OSGB36, the grid reference (where provided) is based on the British national grid reference system used by the Ordnance Survey. • "Guide to National Grid". Ordnance Survey. • "Get-a-map". Ordnance Survey.)	Geo-coordinates	Notes	LB Number (Note: Historic Environment Scotland assign a unique alphanumeric identifier to each designated site in Scotland, for listed buildings this always begins with "LB", for example "LB12345".)	Image
Keils-Tool Shed, Former Byre - A Black				55°50′39″N 5°57′12″W	Category C(S)	13774	Upload Photo
Fladda Lighthouse				56°14′54″N 5°40′50″W	Category B	11588	Upload another image See more images
Keils - Byre, Former Cottage And Byre And Former Byre, Now Tractor Shed - A Black				55°50′39″N 5°57′16″W	Category B	11613	Upload Photo
Old Pier, Small Isles Harbour, (Craighouse)				55°50′02″N 5°57′00″W	Category B	11620	Upload another image See more images
Store-Houses, And Shop Small Isles Harbour, (Craighouse) (W. Nicholson, Miss J. Mcisaac And A. Templeton's Shop)				55°50′01″N 5°57′03″W	Category C(S)	11621	Upload Photo
Feolin Ferry House Feolin				55°50′49″N 6°05′25″W	Category C(S)	11627	Upload Photo
Lagg, Farm-House And Barn, Lagg				55°56′13″N 5°51′11″W	Category B	11581	Upload another image See more images
Lagg Harbour, Lagg Bay				55°56′24″N 5°50′48″W	Category B	11582	Upload Photo
Keils-Cottage - M Darroch				55°50′38″N 5°57′10″W	Category C(S)	11619	Upload Photo
Sun-Dial, Walled Garden, Jura House Estate				55°47′58″N 6°00′55″W	Category C(S)	11625	Upload Photo
Keils - Disused Cottage To North Of A Black's Garden				55°50′40″N 5°57′14″W	Category B	11614	Upload Photo
Keils - Disused Cottage To South Of A Gordon				55°50′40″N 5°57′17″W	Category B	11615	Upload Photo
Craighouse, Bridge Over Abhainn A'Mhuilinn				55°50′00″N 5°57′03″W	Category C(S)	49665	Upload Photo
Ardlussa Slip, Traigh An Airgid				56°01′41″N 5°46′09″W	Category C(S)	11584	Upload Photo
Jura, Craighouse, The Old Millhouse				55°50′01″N 5°57′05″W	Category C(S)	45857	Upload Photo
Ardlussa House				56°01′36″N 5°46′23″W	Category B	11583	Upload another image See more images
Keils-Cottage - A Clark And Byre				55°50′39″N 5°57′18″W	Category C(S)	11617	Upload Photo
Keils-Cottage - D Shaw				55°50′38″N 5°57′13″W	Category C(S)	11618	Upload Photo
Campbell Of Jura Mausoleum, Kilearnadale Burial Ground				55°50′54″N 5°57′25″W	Category B	11622	Upload another image
Jura Free Church, Largie Breck				55°52′16″N 5°56′07″W	Category B	11629	Upload another image See more images
St. Columba's Monastery				56°13′17″N 5°48′29″W	Category A	11587	Upload Photo
Jura Parish Church, Moine A'Chladaich				55°50′21″N 5°57′00″W	Category B	11611	Upload another image See more images
Keils-Farmhouse - A Black				55°50′39″N 5°57′14″W	Category C(S)	11612	Upload Photo
Jura House, Ardfin				55°48′01″N 6°00′49″W	Category C(S)	11623	Upload another image See more images
Walled Garden, Jura House Estate				55°47′59″N 6°00′53″W	Category C(S)	11624	Upload Photo
Feolin Jetty, Feolin				55°50′54″N 6°05′27″W	Category B	11628	Upload Photo
Bridge, Corran River, Fealin-Lagg Road				55°52′43″N 5°55′38″W	Category B	11630	Upload another image See more images
Scarba, Kilmory Lodge				56°11′21″N 5°41′08″W	Category B	12383	Upload another image See more images
Lunga Farm-House				56°12′59″N 5°41′36″W	Category B	11585	Upload Photo
Store-House, Near Lunga Jetty				56°12′59″N 5°41′31″W	Category C(S)	11586	Upload Photo
Keils - Store/Hut East Of A Keith				55°50′40″N 5°57′17″W	Category C(S)	11616	Upload Photo
Claig Castle, Am Fraoch Eilean				55°47′29″N 6°02′07″W	Category C(S)	11626	Upload another image See more images

== Key ==
The scheme for classifying buildings in Scotland is:

- Category A: "buildings of national or international importance, either architectural or historic; or fine, little-altered examples of some particular period, style or building type."
- Category B: "buildings of regional or more than local importance; or major examples of some particular period, style or building type, which may have been altered."
- Category C: "buildings of local importance; lesser examples of any period, style, or building type, as originally constructed or moderately altered; and simple traditional buildings which group well with other listed buildings."

In March 2016 there were 47,288 listed buildings in Scotland. Of these, 8% were Category A, and 50% were Category B, with the remaining 42% being Category C.

== See also ==
- List of listed buildings in Argyll and Bute
