= Jura distillery =

Scotch whisky distillery

Coordinates: 55°49′58.4″N 5°57′3.8″W

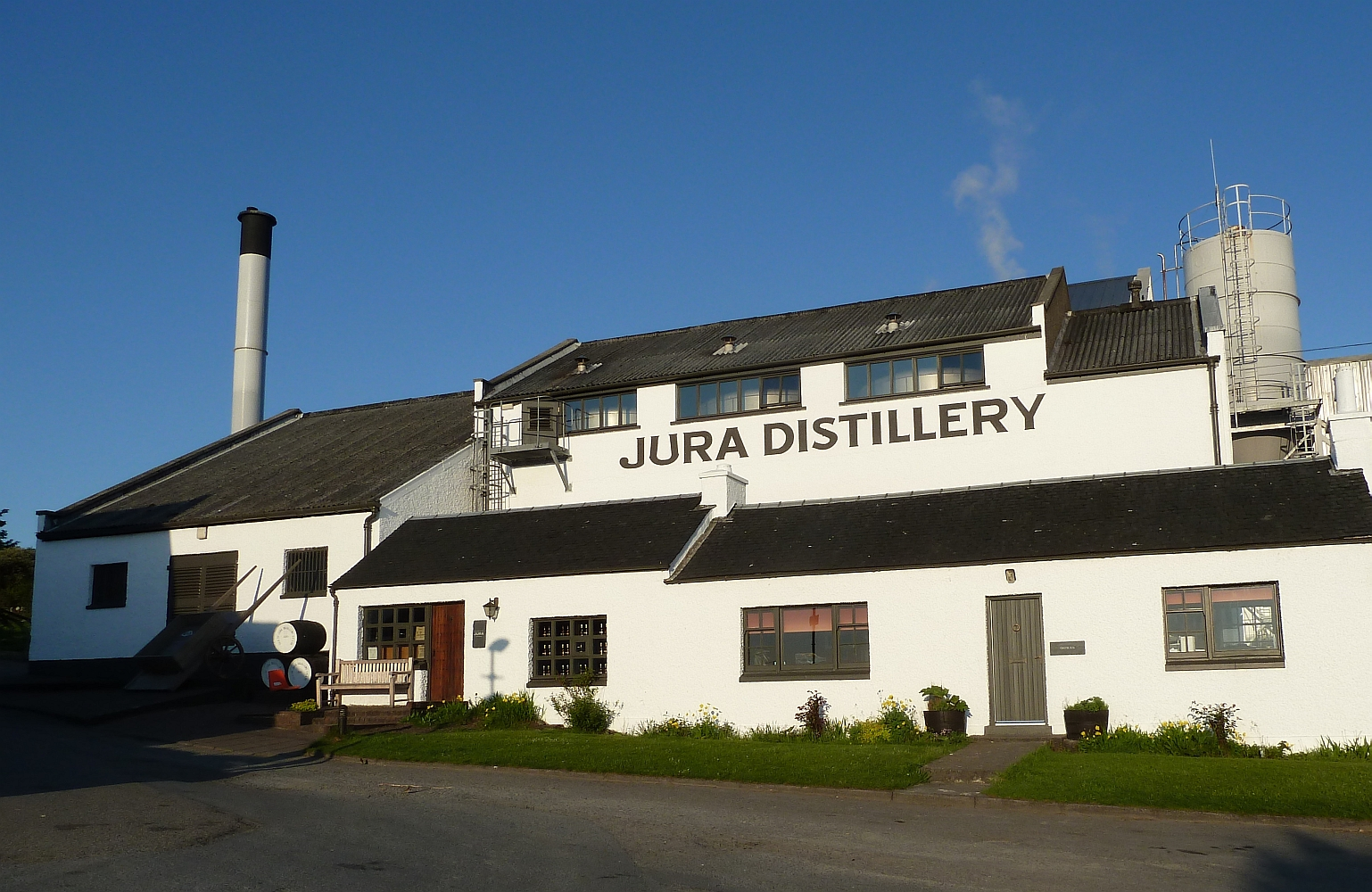

Region: Island
- Location: Jura
- Owner: Whyte & Mackay
- Founded: 1810
- Status: Operational
- Water source: Loch a’Bhaile Mhargaidh
- No. of stills: 2 wash stills (24,500 L); 2 spirit stills (15,500 L)
- Capacity: 2,500,000 L

Jura distillery is Island single malt Scotch whisky distillery located on the island of Jura in the Inner Hebrides off the West Coast of Scotland.

The distillery is operated by Whyte & Mackay, which Philippines-based Alliance Global owns.

== The location ==
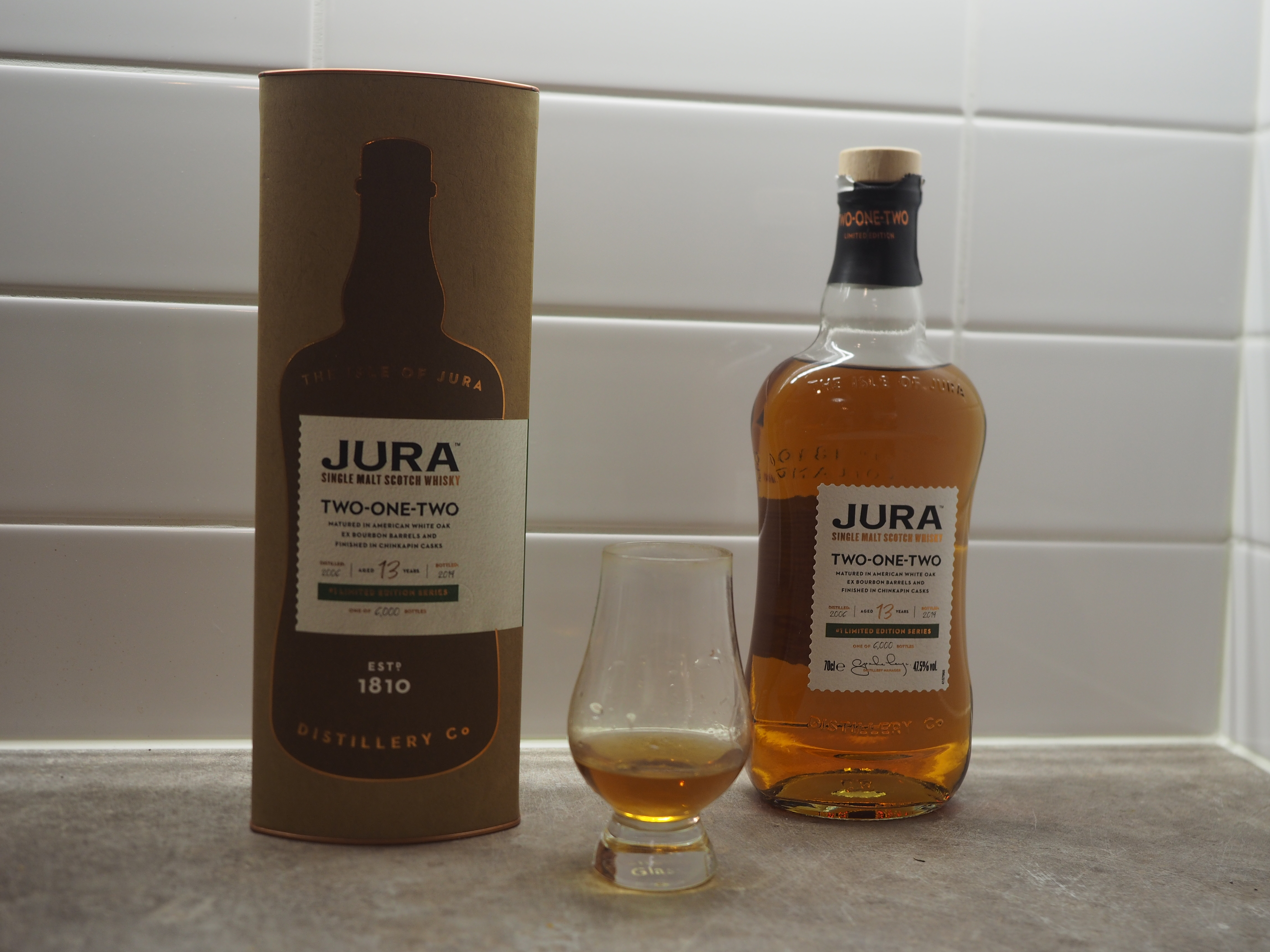
Jura Two-One-Two whisky was named after the 212 inhabitants of the island of Jura.

The island of Jura is seven miles (11 km) wide and thirty miles (48 km) long and it has only one road, one pub, and one distillery. There are seven estates on Jura: Ardfin, Inver, Jura Forest, Ruantallain, Tarbert, Ardlussa, and Barnhill. Approximately 250 people live on the island, while it has a red deer population of around 5000. The inhabitants of Jura are known as Diurachs, which is their Gaelic name.

"Extremely unget-at-able" was how George Orwell described the location of the Isle of Jura in 1946; the island remains difficult to reach today. Most travelers to Jura go by Caledonian MacBrayne car ferry from Kennacraig on the Kintyre Peninsula to Islay, and then cross to Jura from Port Askaig on Islay by the MV Eilean Dhiura, a small vehicle ferry which is run by ASP Ships on behalf of Argyll and Bute Council. Islay can also be reached by air: Islay Airport is served by daily flights from Glasgow. From March to October there is also a passenger ferry from Tayvallich on the west coast of Scotland.

== History ==
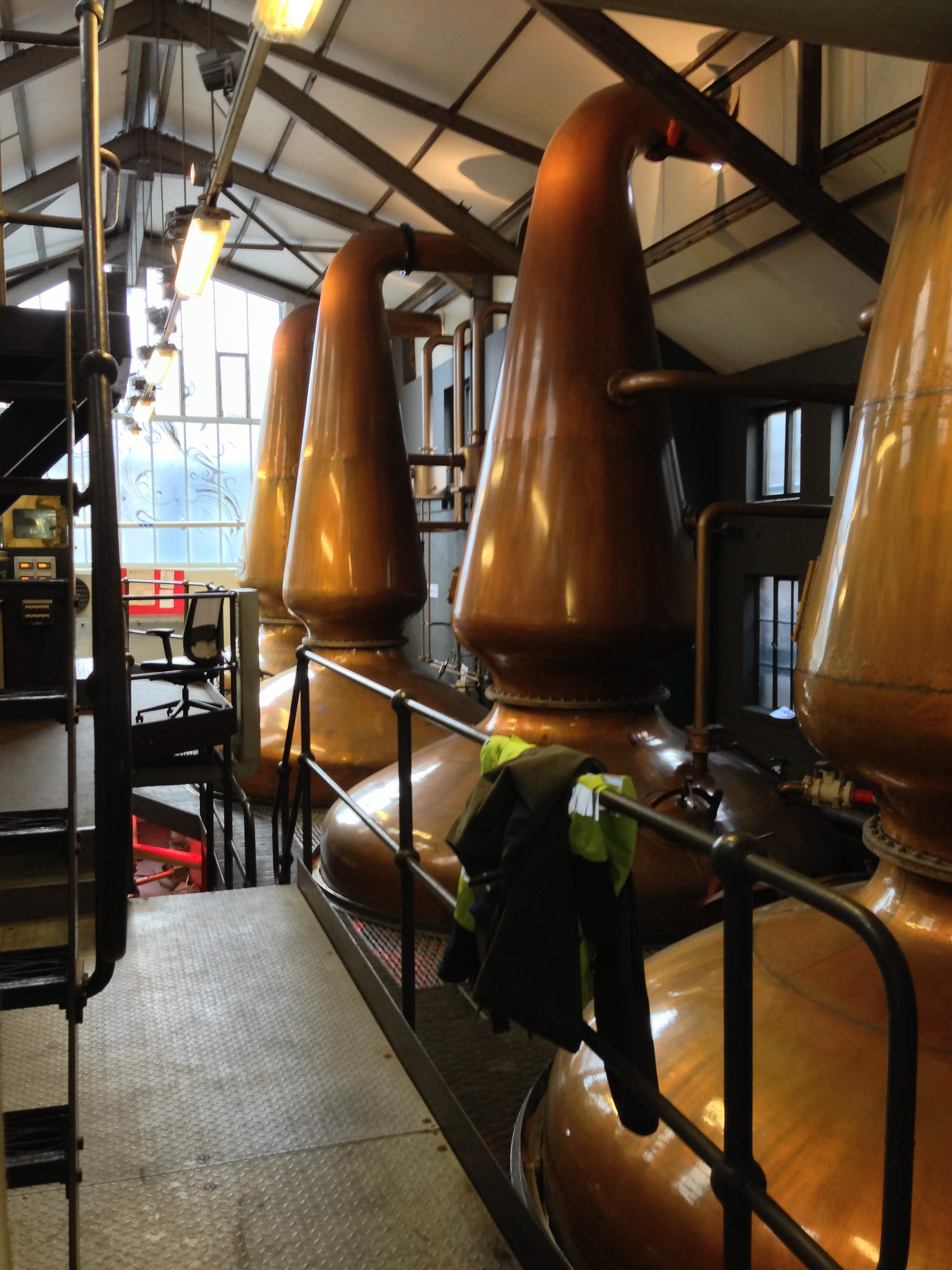
The copper stills

The distillery was founded by the Laird of Jura, Archibald Campbell in 1810. The distillery fell into disrepair but was restored in 1884. Around 1900, it was again in disuse and dismantled.

In the 1950s two local estate owners, Robin Fletcher and Tony Riley-Smith, keen to revive the local economy, had the distillery rebuilt and expanded by the architects Lothian, Barclay, Jarvis & Boys with input from whisky and distillery expert William Delmé-Evans. The work was completed in 1963, and included the installation of taller stills, allowing the distillery to create a mix of malts.

In 1985, Invergordon Distillers acquired the distillery.

In 1993, Whyte & Mackay purchased Invergordon Distillers, including the distilleries Jura, Bruichladdich, and Tullibardine.

=== Timeline of ownership ===
- The Campbell of Jura Family 1810–1853
- Norman Buchanan 1853–1861
- J & K Orr 1867–1876
- James Ferguson & Sons 1876–1901
- Charles Mackinlay & Co 1960
- Scottish & Newcastle Breweries 1960–1985
- Invergordon Distillers 1985–1995
- Whyte and Mackay Group 1995–2014
- Emperador Distillers Inc (Alliance Global) 2014–present

== Products ==
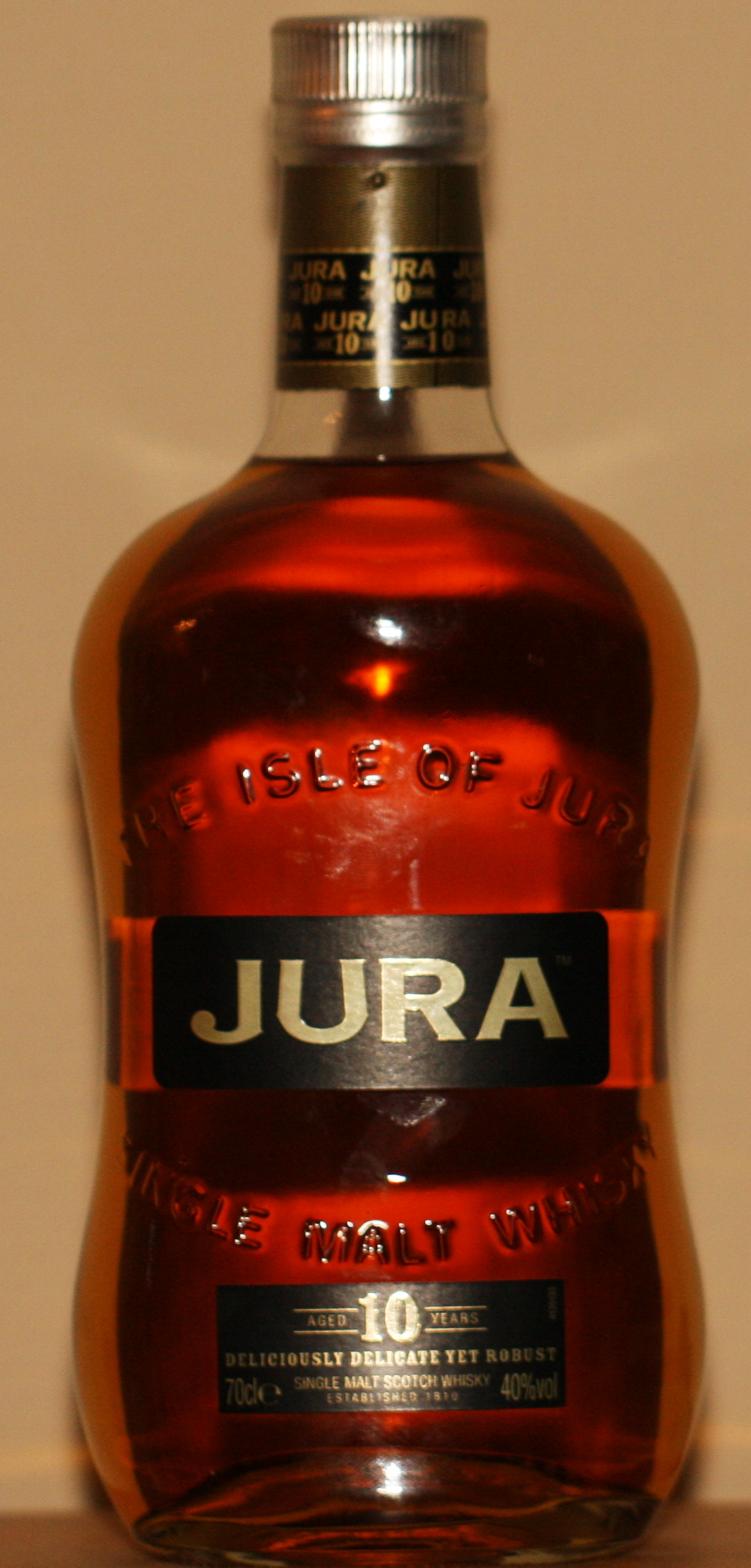
Jura Single Malt Whisky 10 years old

Jura's current offering comprises 26 single malt whiskies that are divided over three product series: Signature, Travel Exclusive and Rare & Limited.

=== Discontinued products ===
- "Origin" – a ten-year-old whisky, a non-peated malt having a "heather honey" finish
- "Diurachs' Own" – sixteen years old, rich and full-bodied in nature
- "Superstition" – a single malt "lightly peated with hints of smoke and spice"
- "Prophecy" – a heavily peated malt, bottled without chill filtration. In the early 1700s, the Campbells of Jura evicted a man who prophesied that the last Campbell to leave the island would be one-eyed with his belongings carried in a cart drawn by a lone white horse. In 1938 Charles Campbell, blind in one eye from a war injury, fell on hard times and led his white horse to the old pier for the last time.

== Brand ambassadors ==
Willie Tait is one of two brand ambassadors. He began working at the distillery in 1975, and worked as a tunroom man, mash, stillman under manager, distillery manager and master distiller, before taking the role of brand ambassador. In 2011 he was awarded a Lifetime Achievement Award from Malt Advocate magazine.

Willie Cochrane, the other brand ambassador, started at the Jura distillery as a mash & still operator in 1976. Soon after, he was promoted to the dual roles of brewer and engineer. After thirty years, he became the distillery manager.

== Awards ==
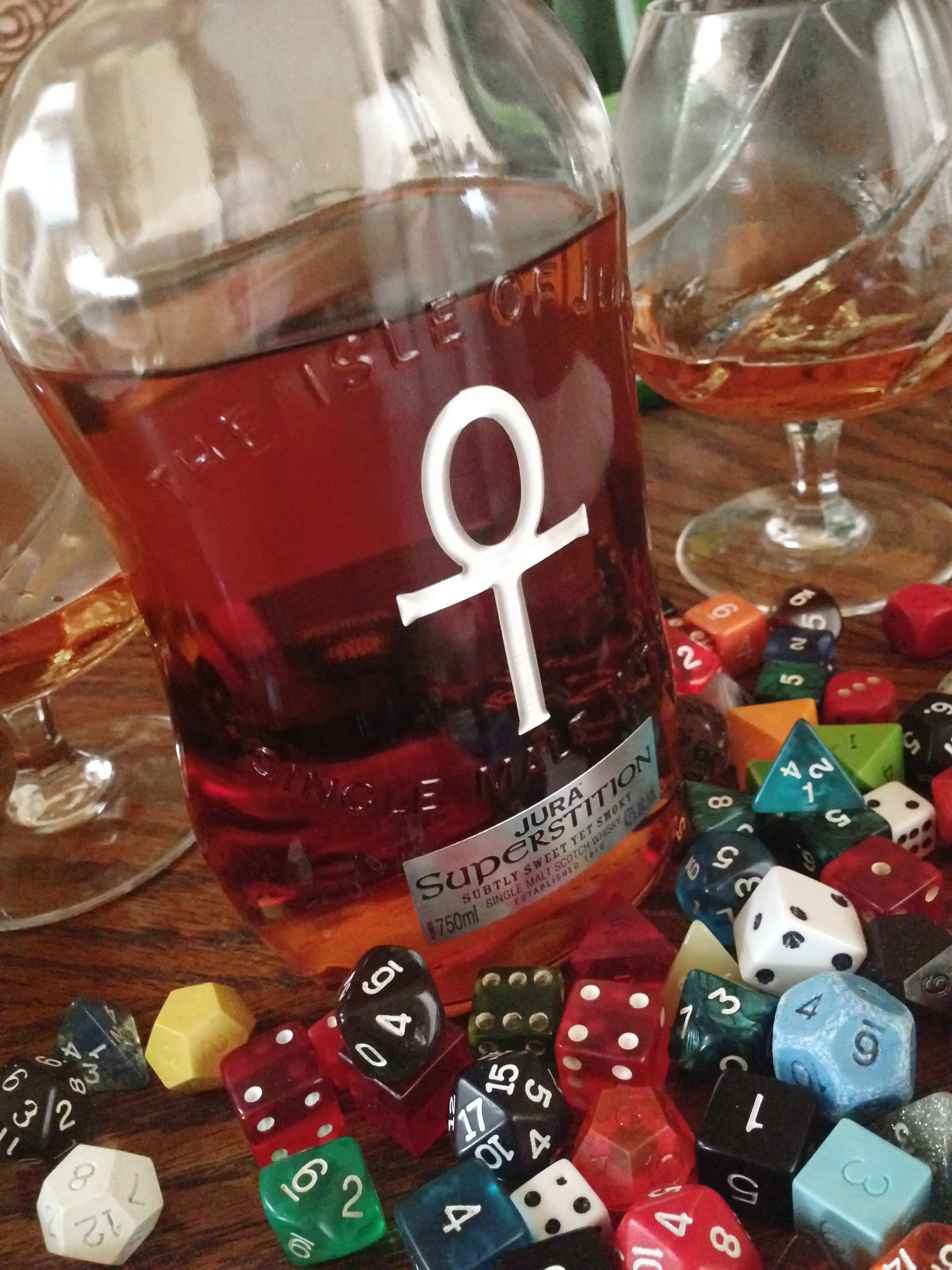
Jura Superstition

- Gold Quality Award from the international quality institute Monde Selection, 2006.
- Jura Prophecy: Gold (Best in Class), International Wine & Spirits Competition, 2010
- Jura Diurachs' 16YO: Gold (Best in Class), International Wine & Spirits Competition, 2010
- Jura Superstition: Double Gold Medal, San Francisco World Spirits Competition, 2009
- Jura Origin 10YO: Silver, International Wine & Spirits Competition, 2010

== See also ==
- Scotch whisky
- List of distilleries in Scotland
- List of whisky brands
