= Sound of Islay =

- Caol Ìle (Scottish Gaelic)
- Islay and south Jura. The Sound of Islay lies between them at top right.

- Location within Scotland
- Coordinates: 55.85°N 6.10°W
- Type: Sound
- Frozen: No

The Sound of Islay (Scottish Gaelic: Caol Ìle) is a narrow strait between the islands of Islay and Jura off the west coast of Scotland. It is about 30 kilometres (20 miles) in extent from north to south and lies between Rubh' a' Mhàil on Islay and Rubh' Aird na Sgitheich on Jura to the north and Macarthur's Head and Rubha na Tràille to the south. The islands in the Sound are Am Fraoch Eilean, Brosdale Island and Glas Eilean, all of which are off the south east coast of Jura. These islands, Jura south of Loch Tarbert and the eastern part of the Sound are one of 40 National Scenic Areas in Scotland.

== History ==
Am Fraoch Eilean (meaning "heather isle") contains the ruins of the medieval stronghold Claig Castle. It was built by Somerled in 1154 to defend the Sound and later used as a prison. Unusually for the Argyll islands the design, which is a Norman square tower with 3-metre-thick (10-foot) walls, is similar in style to mainland castles of the period. The Sound has been suggested as the location of the 1156 Battle of Epiphany.

In 1549 Dean Monro wrote: "At the mouth of Kyle Ila, betwixt it and Duray, lyes ane ile, callit in Erische Leid Ellan Charne, in English the iyle of Earne". This may refer to Eilean a' Chùirn at NR472489.

== Ferry ==
Argyll and Bute Council operate a vehicle and passenger ferry service across the Sound from Feolin slipway on the west coast of Jura to Port Askaig on Islay, and Caledonian MacBrayne operate a vehicle and passenger ferry between Port Askaig and Kennacraig, on the mainland in West Loch Tarbert.

== Renewable energy ==
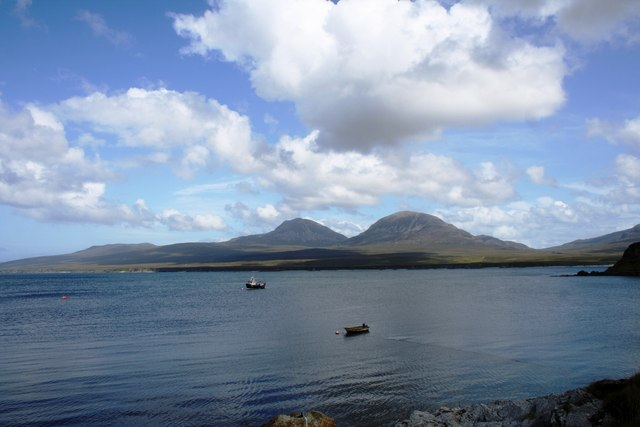
Looking across the Sound from Bunnahabhain on Islay towards the Paps of Jura.

In March 2011, the Scottish Government approved the largest tidal array in the world for the Sound of Islay, with 10 planned tidal turbines predicted to generate enough power for over 5,000 homes. The site offers both high currents and shelter from storms.

== Sources ==
- Haswell-Smith, Hamish (2004). The Scottish Islands. Edinburgh: Canongate. ISBN 978-1-84195-454-7.
- Marsden, John (2008) Somerled and the Emergence of Gaelic Scotland. Birlinn. East Linton. First published, 2000.
- Monro, Sir Donald (1549) Description of the Western Isles of Scotland. William Auld. Edinburgh - 1774 edition.
- RCAHMS (1984) Argyll: Islay, Jura, Colonsay & Oronsay.
