= Keils =

Coordinates: 55.843946°N 5.9532584°W

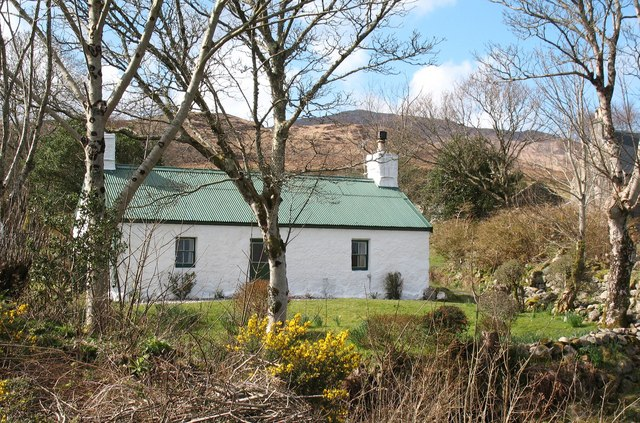

- Location within Argyll and Bute
- Civil parish: Jura
- Council area: Argyll and Bute
- Country: Scotland
- Sovereign state: United Kingdom
- Police: Scotland
- Fire: Scottish
- Ambulance: Scottish

Keils formerly Kilearnadill is a hamlet 0.25 miles (0.40 km) from Craighouse on the island of Jura, in the council area of Argyll and Bute, Scotland. Keils is located on a wide elevated but distinct ridge.

== History ==
The name "Keils" means "Cell".

== Landmarks ==
On the 1981 OS 1:10000 map there were 18 buildings. Keils Church lies along the A846 road to the south of the village on the way to Craighouse. Alba Cottage, run as a B&B, is also situated on the A846 road.
