= Small Isles, Argyll =

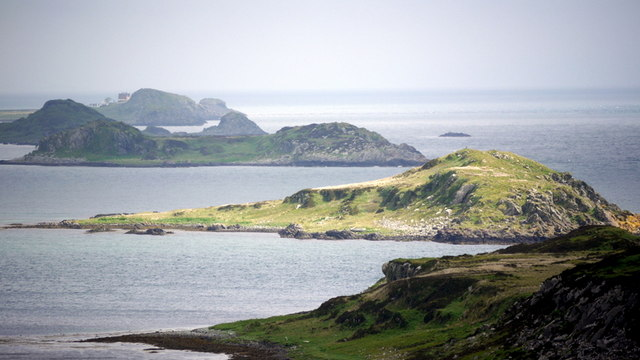

Location
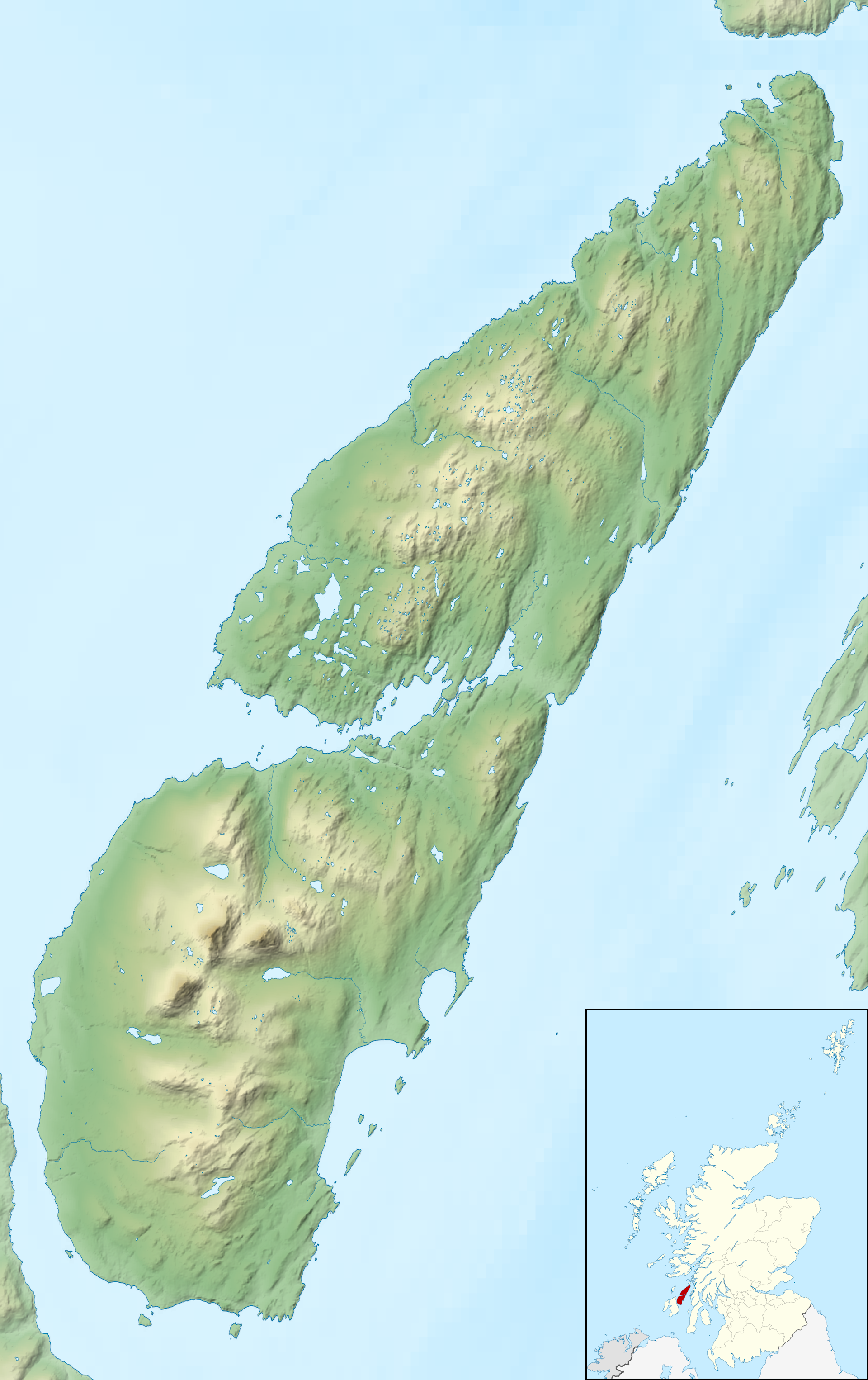
- Small Isles shown next to Jura Brosdale Island within Argyll and Bute
- OS grid reference: NR5449768466
- Coordinates: 55.846723°N 5.9234548°W

Physical geography
- Island group: Inner Hebrides

Administration
- Council area: Argyll and Bute
- Country: Scotland
- Sovereign state: United Kingdom

Demographics
- Population: 0

The Small Isles are a group of uninhabited islands east of Jura, in the council area of Argyll and Bute, Scotland. From south to north, the five islands are Eilean nan Gabhar (Island of the Goats), Eilean nan Coinein (Island of the Rabbits), Eilean Diomhain (Idle Island), Pladda and Eilean Bhride (Bridget's Island). Eilean nan Coinein is located 1.25 miles (2.01 km) away from Craighouse. A 19th century sloop called Agnes was wrecked at the Small Isles in December 1858. Its length was 12 meters and beam 4 meters. A 19th century sloop called Thistle was wrecked at the Small Isles in on the 1 February 1864. The crew was saved. Thistle was built in 1827 and its length was 16 meters and beam 5 meters.
