= Inverlussa =

Coordinates: 56.016742°N 5.7838672°W

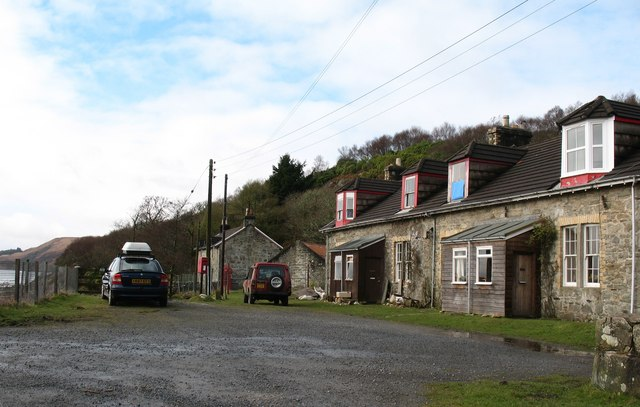

- Location within Argyll and Bute
- Civil parish: Jura
- Council area: Argyll and Bute
- Country: Scotland
- Sovereign state: United Kingdom
- Police: Scotland
- Fire: Scottish
- Ambulance: Scottish

Inverlussa is a hamlet 1 mile (1.6 km) southwest of Ardlussa and 14 miles from Craighouse at the mouth of Lussa River on the east coast of the island of Jura, in the council area of Argyll and Bute, Scotland. It is largely a linear settlement.

== History ==
The name "Inverlussa" is Gaelic/Norse and it means "The mouth of the bright river".

== Landmarks ==
Historically there was a small chapel at Inverlussa.
