= Knockrome =

Hamlet on Jura, Scotland

Coordinates: 55.877261°N 5.9110335°W

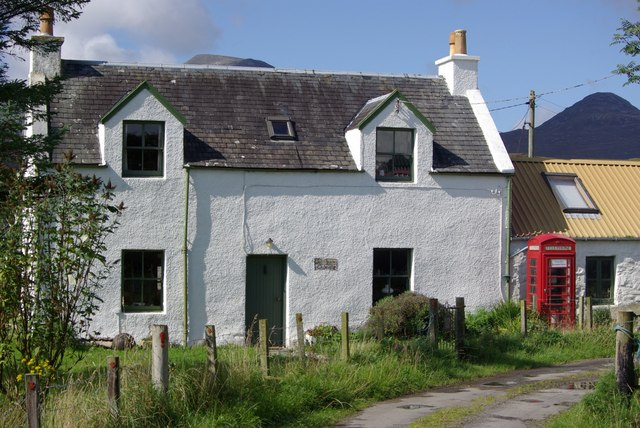

- Location within Argyll and Bute
- OS grid reference: NR5671
- Civil parish: Jura
- Council area: Argyll and Bute
- Country: Scotland
- Sovereign state: United Kingdom
- Police: Scotland
- Fire: Scottish
- Ambulance: Scottish

Knockrome is a hamlet on the island of Jura, in the civil parish of Jura, in the council area of Argyll and Bute, Scotland. On the 1982 OS 1:10000 map, there were 20 buildings. Knockrome is located about 3.5 miles from Craighouse, on lower lying ground between Knockrome Hill and Cnocan Soilleir. Knockrome is located on the southeast coast of Jura. It is north of Jura Airfield and a prehistoric standing stone.

== History ==
The name "Knockrome" means "The crooked hill".
