= Tarbert, Jura =

Coordinates: 55.970796°N 5.8277857°W

Tarbert
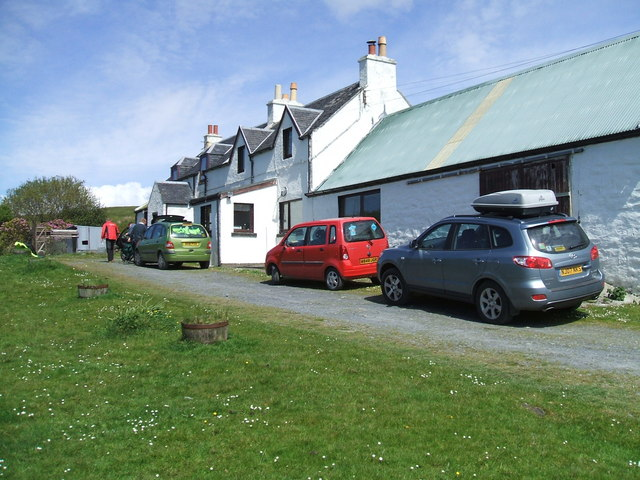

- Location within Argyll and Bute
- Civil parish: Jura
- Council area: Argyll and Bute
- Country: Scotland
- Sovereign state: United Kingdom
- Police: Scotland
- Fire: Scottish
- Ambulance: Scottish

Tarbert is a hamlet on Tarbert Bay, on the east coast of the island of Jura, in the council area of Argyll and Bute, Scotland. The Tarbert estate is owned by Ginge Manors Estates Ltd. It is on the A846 about 11 miles (18 km) from Craighouse. There is the remains of a chapel that was dedicated to St Columba. Tarbert consists of 2 main areas, the area associated with Rubha nan Crann and the farm overlooking the bay.

== History ==
The name "Tarbert" means "The isthmus".
