= Greg Coffey =

Australian hedge fund manager

- Born: 20 April 1971 (age 55); Sydney, Australia
- Education: Macquarie University
- Occupation: Hedge fund manager
- Spouse: Ania Brzezinski
- Children: 3

Greg Coffey is an Australian hedge fund manager based in London. Nicknamed "The Wizard of Oz" during his time at GLG Partners and Moore Capital Management, in 2012 he declared retirement at the age of 41 and returned to Sydney. In early 2018, Coffey's plans to launch a new fund were announced.

== Early life and education ==
Coffey attended St Patrick's College, Strathfield, matriculating in 1988.

Coffey graduated with a Bachelor of Economics from Macquarie University in 1995.

== Career ==
Coffey joined Macquarie Bank in 1993 and in 1994 traded emerging-market equity derivatives at Bankers Trust and Deutsche Bank AG. Coffey was hired by Blueborder Partners, a George Soros related hedge fund and was then hired by Bank Austria to oversee global equity proprietary trading.

Coffey was then a trader at GLG Partners (GLG), and is estimated to have earned £170 million in 2007 after increasing by 51% the value of his emerging markets fund. In April 2008 he announced his departure from GLG, effective in October, and leaving behind his A$200 million GLG Partners compensation package. Industry sources estimated that Coffey had been responsible for two-thirds of GLG's performance fees during his time there. In November 2008 became co-chief investment officer of Moore Europe Capital Management, a subsidiary of Moore Capital Management. In October 2012, at the age of 41, he announced his retirement.

In December 2017, it was rumored that Coffey would launch a new hedge fund. In February 2018, Kirkoswald Capital Partners was reported to have commitments from investors of A$3.5 billion. The size of the new fund would be capped at A$2 billion and offices will be headquartered in London.

== Investments ==
In October 2024, Coffey alongside Stanley Druckenmiller, invested in an AI company Reflexivity in their most recent round to raise 30 million dollars.

== Personal life ==
Coffey is married to Ania Brzezinski, and they reside in the Sydney suburb of Balmoral. They also own a ski chalet in Switzerland, a house in London's Chelsea, and, in 2022, acquired a 18-hectare (45-acre) estate in Southampton, New York for US$105 million; previously owned by Anne McDonnell, the first wife of Henry Ford II. The couple has three children.

In November 2010, Coffey bought Ardfin Estate, a 4,900-hectare (12,000-acre) sporting estate on the island of Jura in Scotland. The purchase attracted controversy and concern over Coffey's decision to close the estate's public gardens, whose 2,500 visitors a year formed a significant source of income for Jura. In 2011, a spokesperson for Coffey said that his "full intention" was to re-open the gardens during 2012, but the gardens have remained closed. Coffey constructed an 18-hole private golf course on the estate. The work was completed in 2018 and the course opened in spring 2019.

=== Net worth ===
In 2013, Coffey was listed on the Sunday Times Rich List with an assessed net worth of £260 million. As of May 2025, the Financial Review assessed Coffey's net worth as A$1.24 billion on the 2025 Rich List.

Year	Financial Review Rich List		Forbes Australia's 50 Richest	
Year	Rank	Net worth (A$)	Rank	Net worth (US$)
2008^{[note a]}		$300 million		
2009				
2010		$335 million		
2011				
2012^{[note a]}		$665 million ▲		
2013				
2014				
2015				
2016				
2017		$482 million		
2018	177 ▲	$486 million ▲		
2019	192 ▼	$491 million ▲		
2020	164 ▲	$655 million ▲		
2021	170 ▼	$668 million ▲		
2022	154 ▲	$862 million ▲		
2023	144 ▲	$989 million ▲		
2024		$1.10 billion ▲		
2025	133 ▲	$1.24 billion ▲		

Legend
Icon	Description
Steady	Has not changed from the previous year
▲	Has increased from the previous year
▼	Has decreased from the previous year

== Notes ==
- ^a: Net worth drawn from the BRW Young Rich List
