= A846 road =

Road on Islay and Jura, Argyll and Bute, Scotland

Coordinates: 55.84237°N 6.08813°W

A846

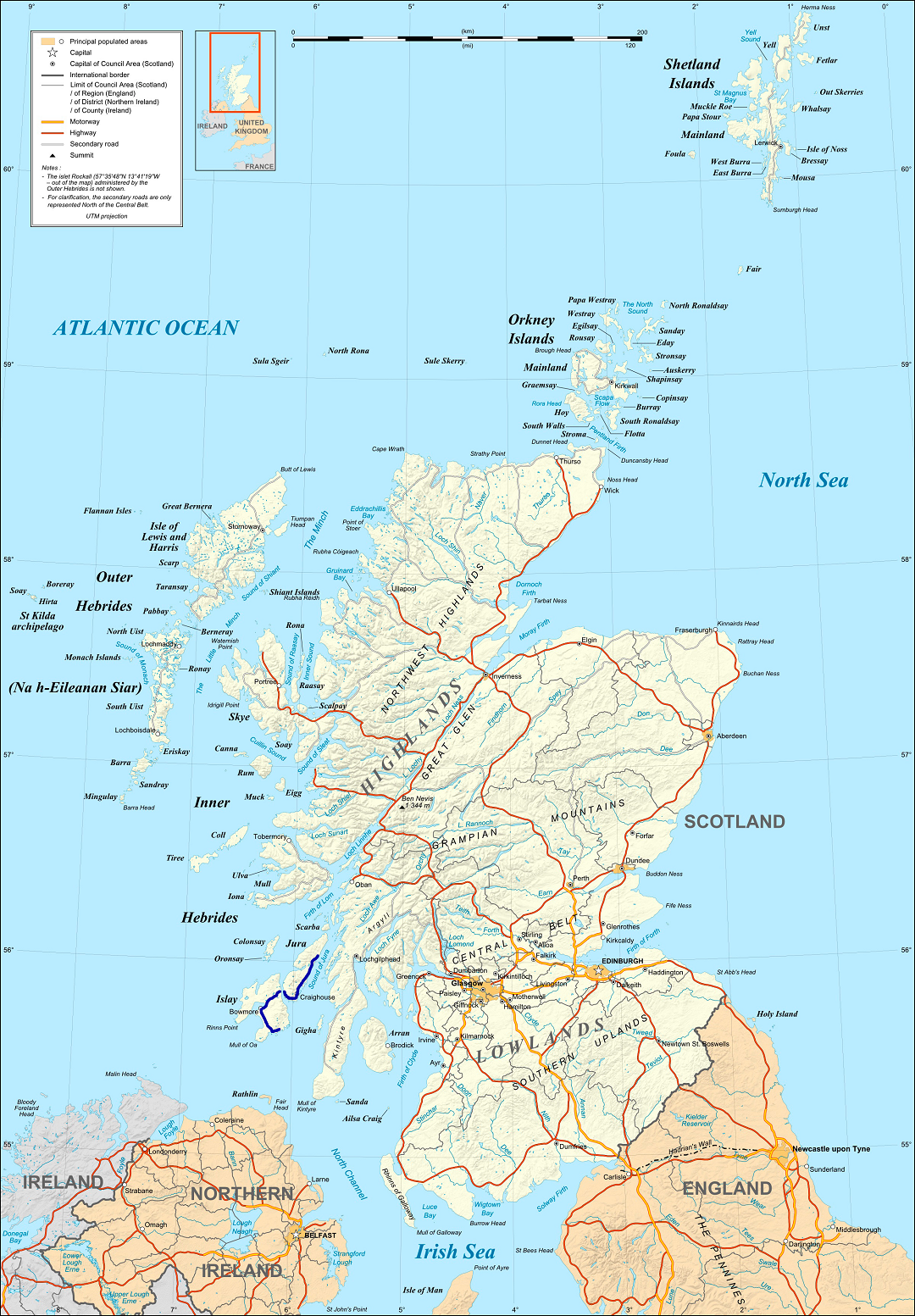

Route information
- Length: 47.6 mi (76.6 km)

Major junctions
- From: Lussagiven
- A847
- To: Ardbeg

Location
- Country: United Kingdom
- Constituent country: Scotland

Road network
- Roads in the United Kingdom; Motorways; A and B road zones

The A846 road is one of the two principal roads of Islay in the Inner Hebrides off the west coast of mainland Scotland and the only 'A' road on the neighbouring island of Jura.

A ferry connects the two islands across the Sound of Islay.

It connects Lussagiven on Jura with Ardbeg on Islay (via a ferry crossing) which is a distance of some 47.6 miles (76.6 km) by road – considerably less by boat. The road goes further north than Lussagiven but as a minor road through Ardlussa and Lealt and then as a track to Kinuachdrachd. The road also goes further than Ardbeg, going through Kintour and as a track to Ardtalla.

== Settlements on or near the A846 ==
North to South

- Lussagiven
- Lagg
- Leargybreck
- Craighouse
- Cabrach
- Feolin Ferry

Ferry between Jura and Islay

- Port Askaig
- Keills
- Ballygrant
- Bridgend (junction with the A847)
- Bowmore
- Glenegedale
- Port Ellen
- Laphroaig
- Lagavulin
- Ardbeg
