= Ardbeg, Islay =

Settlement on Islay, in Scotland

Coordinates: 55.636°N 6.127°W

Ardbeg: Scottish Gaelic: An Àird Bheag
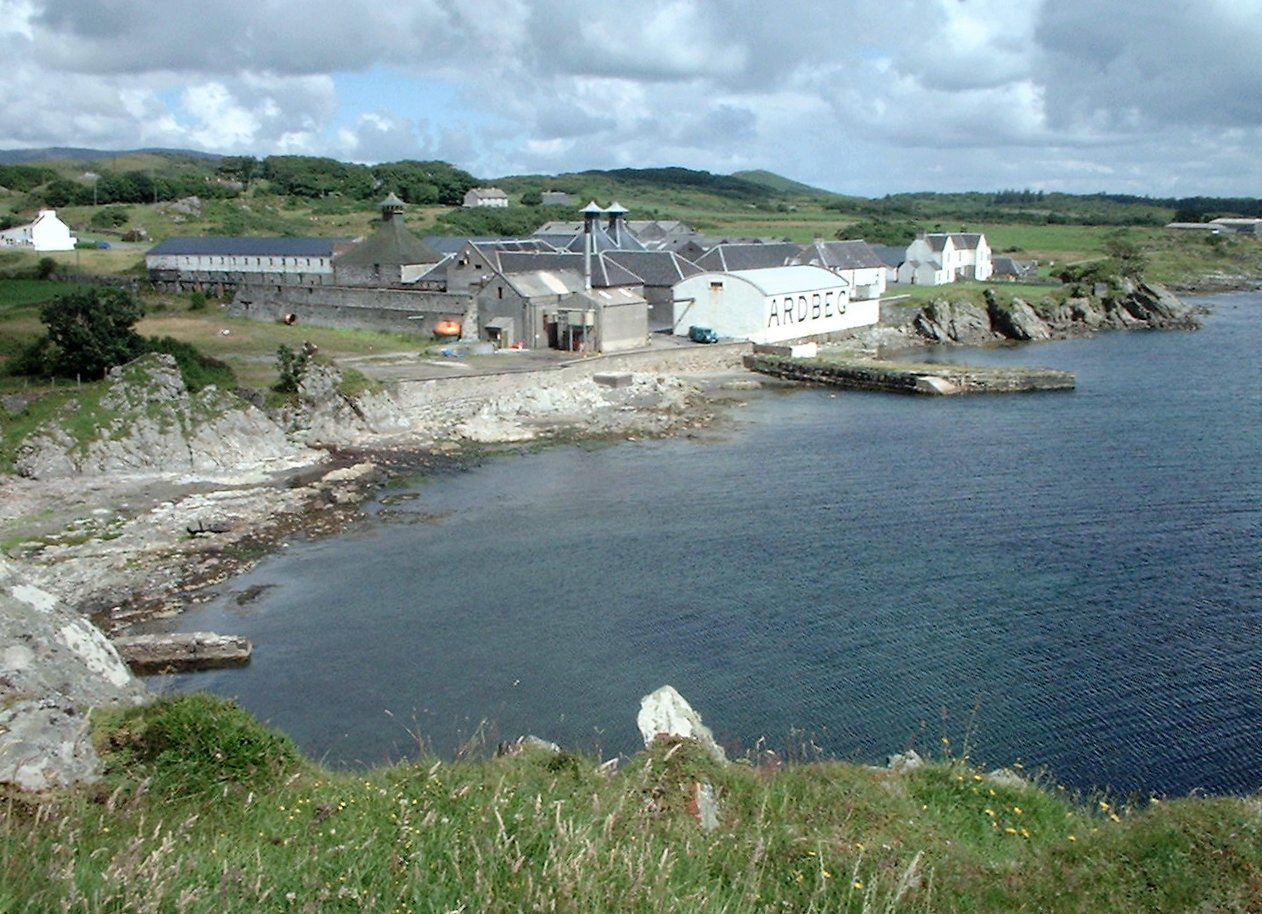
- Ardbeg and the distillery

- Location within Argyll and Bute
- OS grid reference: NR415464
- Civil parish: Kildalton and Oa
- Council area: Argyll and Bute
- Lieutenancy area: Argyll and Bute
- Country: Scotland
- Sovereign state: United Kingdom
- Post town: ISLE OF ISLAY
- Postcode district: PA42
- Dialling code: 01496
- UK Parliament: Argyll, Bute and South Lochaber
- Scottish Parliament: Argyll and Bute

Ardbeg (Scottish Gaelic: An Àird Bheag, lit. 'the little promontory') is a small settlement on southern coast of the island of Islay, in the council area of Argyll and Bute, off the west coast of Scotland. It is around 3 miles (5 kilometres) east of Port Ellen and 1 mile (1.5 kilometres) northeast of Lagavulin at the eastern terminus of the A846 road.

Ardbeg is the site of the Ardbeg distillery (Scottish Gaelic: Taigh-staile na h-Àirde Bige) which was established in 1815 and produces malt whisky. The village grew up around the distillery and by 1900 was home to over 40 distillery workers and had a village school with over 100 pupils. By the end of the 1920s the decline in the village was "noticeable".

The name Ardbeg is an anglicisation of the Scottish Gaelic An Àird Bheag, meaning The Small Promontory.
