= MV Eilean Dhiura =

Ferry built in 1998

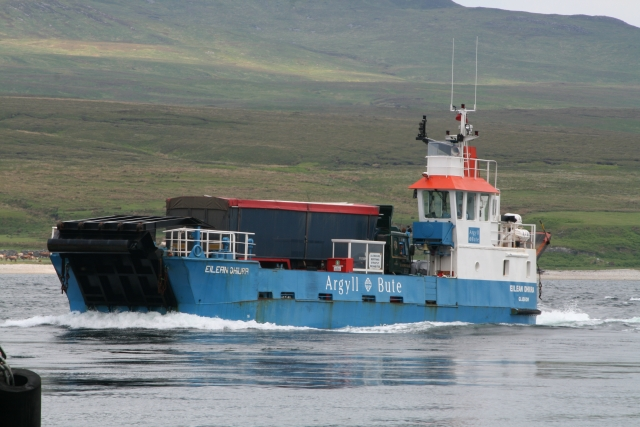
- MV Eilean Dhiura

History

United Kingdom
- Name: MV Eilean Dhiura
- Namesake: Jura
- Owner: Argyll and Bute Council
- Operator: ASP Ship Management
- Route: Port Askaig to Feolin
- Builder: McTay Marine, Bromborough, River Mersey
- Yard number: 121
- In service: 1998
- Identification: IMO number: 9186340; Call Sign: MYYF2
- Status: in service

General characteristics
- Class & type: vehicle ferry
- Tonnage: 86 GT 50 DWT

MV Eilean Dhiura is a vehicle ferry operating across the Sound of Islay.

== History ==
Eilean Dhiura was commissioned by Argyll and Bute Council in 1998, to replace Western Ferries' MV Sound of Gigha as the Jura Ferry. She was operated initially by Serco Denholm until 2003, now by ASP Ship Management Ltd.

In December 2000, her bow ramp collapsed while at sea. Following this, the MCA required a secondary door to be fitted behind the bow door. A bid by the council for money to replace her was unsuccessful. A new bow ramp was fitted in 2002.

== Layout ==
Eilean Dhiura is an open landing craft type ferry, with bow and stern ramps. Her slim bridge allows vehicles to drive through. A small enclosed cabin provides shelter for passengers.

== Service ==
Eilean Dhiura is the Feolin Ferry, providing the main access to Jura. Islay is connected to the Scottish mainland by a Caledonian MacBrayne ferry from Kennacraig. Daily, she crosses the 800 yards (700 metres) between Port Askaig on Islay and Feolin. During her overhaul, early in the year, the service is provided by a chartered vessel; in the past this was commonly CalMac's MV Eigg, but since 2007 MV Margaret Sinclair belonging to Inverlussa Shellfish Ltd of Mull, or more recently the Spanish John II, have been used.
