= Lagg, Jura =

Coordinates: 55.937188°N 5.8540074°W

Lagg
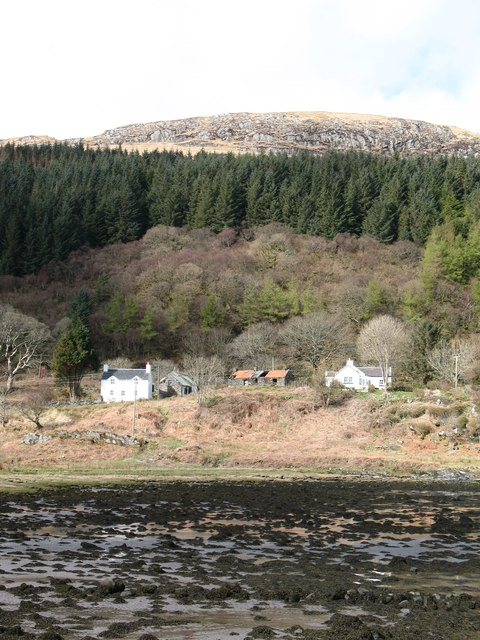

- Location within Argyll and Bute
- Civil parish: Jura
- Council area: Argyll and Bute
- Country: Scotland
- Sovereign state: United Kingdom
- Police: Scotland
- Fire: Scottish
- Ambulance: Scottish

Lagg is a hamlet on Lagg Bay, on the east coast of the island of Jura, in the council area of Argyll and Bute, Scotland. It is on the A846 8 miles (13 km) from Craighouse. Lagg consists of two main areas, Lagg township, above a steep slope from the bay, away from the coastal edge. The former inn is the other. Dunchraobhan (a single dwelling) is at a similar elevation to Lagg.

== History ==
The name "Lagg" means "The hollow". It once was linked from Knapdale with a ferry, which in the 1800s was the principal ferry route from Jura. A proposal to have a car ferry to the mainland was voted against by residents due to increased traffic from people travelling to Islay. Lagg once had a population of 70 but now only four houses remain in the entire glen. Lagg once had a school, a post office and an inn called Lagg Inn which is now Lagg Farm.
