= Ardfernal =

Coordinates: 55.87°N 05.90°W

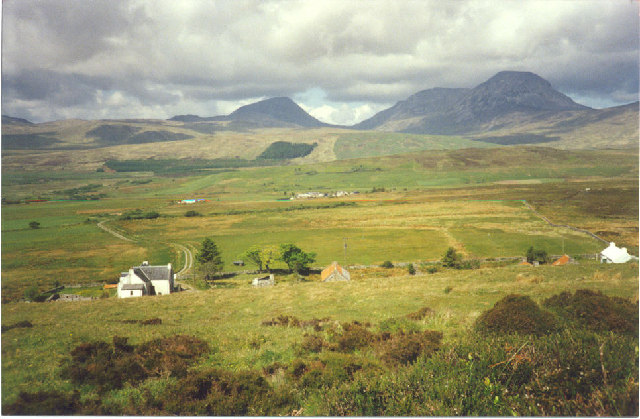
- Ardfernal, looking towards the Paps of Jura

- Location within Argyll and Bute
- OS grid reference: NR5671
- Council area: Argyll and Bute
- Country: Scotland
- Sovereign state: United Kingdom
- Police: Scotland
- Fire: Scottish
- Ambulance: Scottish

Ardfernal (Scottish Gaelic: Àird Fheàrnail) is a hamlet on the island of Jura in Argyll and Bute, Scotland. The township had 16 buildings in 1882 and 9 buildings in 1982. In 1841 it had a population of 128. There remain 8 occupied buildings.

== History ==
The name "Ardfernal" could mean "alder headland" if the entire name is Gaelic but if the 2nd part is Norse meaning "far hill" it could mean "headland of the far hill".
