= Barnhill, Jura =

Farmhouse on Jura, Scotland

Coordinates: 56.1104°N 5.6928°W

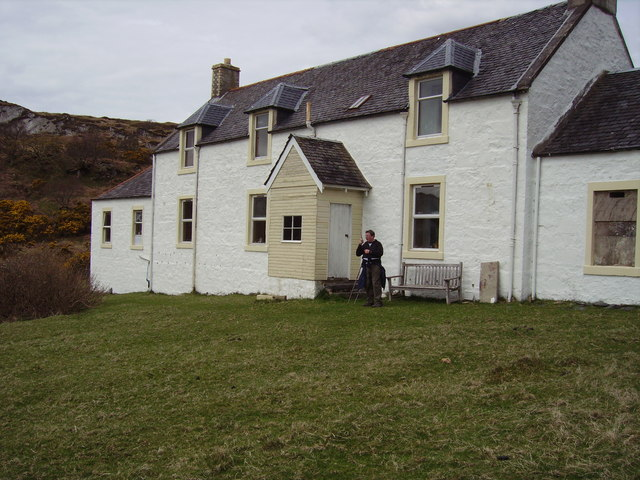
Barnhill in 2008

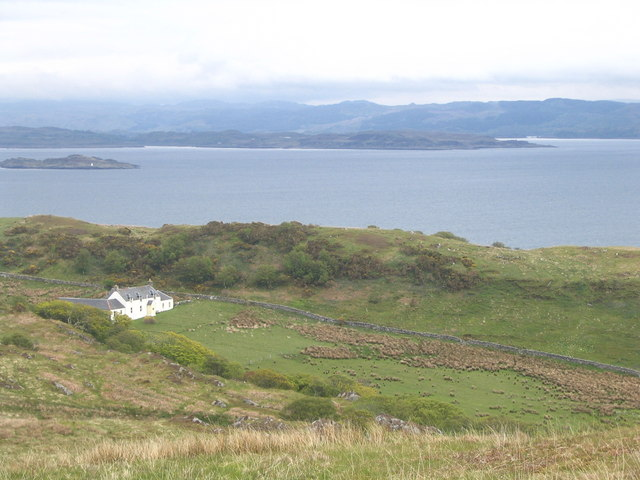
Barnhill with the Sound of Jura and the Scottish mainland behind

Barnhill is a farmhouse in the north of the island of Jura in the Scottish Inner Hebrides overlooking the Sound of Jura. It stands on the site of a larger 15th-century settlement, Cnoc an t-Sabhail; the English name Barnhill has been in use since the early twentieth century. The house was rented by the essayist and novelist George Orwell, who lived there intermittently from 1946 until January 1949. He completed his final novel, Nineteen Eighty-Four, at Barnhill.

According to a BBC report, Orwell was spending months on the island "to escape the daily grind of journalism and to find a clean environment which doctors thought would help him recover from a dangerous bout of tuberculosis". Orwell left Jura in January 1949 to get treatment at a sanatorium at Cranham, Gloucestershire and never returned.

== After 1950 ==
Since Orwell's death in 1950, Barnhill has been a site of interest for many who are familiar with his life and writing. The cottage is still owned by the family that rented it to Orwell and the four-bedroom house is rented as a holiday cottage, remaining in virtually the same condition it was when the author was working on Nineteen Eighty-Four: a generator supplies electricity, the small refrigerator is gas-powered and heat is provided by a coal-fired Rayburn. "If you stay here, you’re really treading in Orwell’s footsteps. He would recognise the place instantly if he were to step through the door today," Orwell Society member Damaris Fletcher told The Guardian.
