= Am Fraoch Eilean =

Island in Scotland

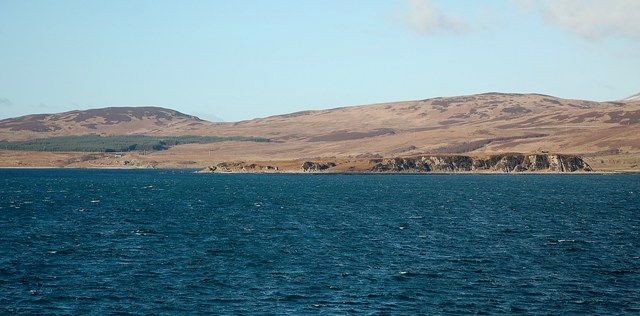

Location
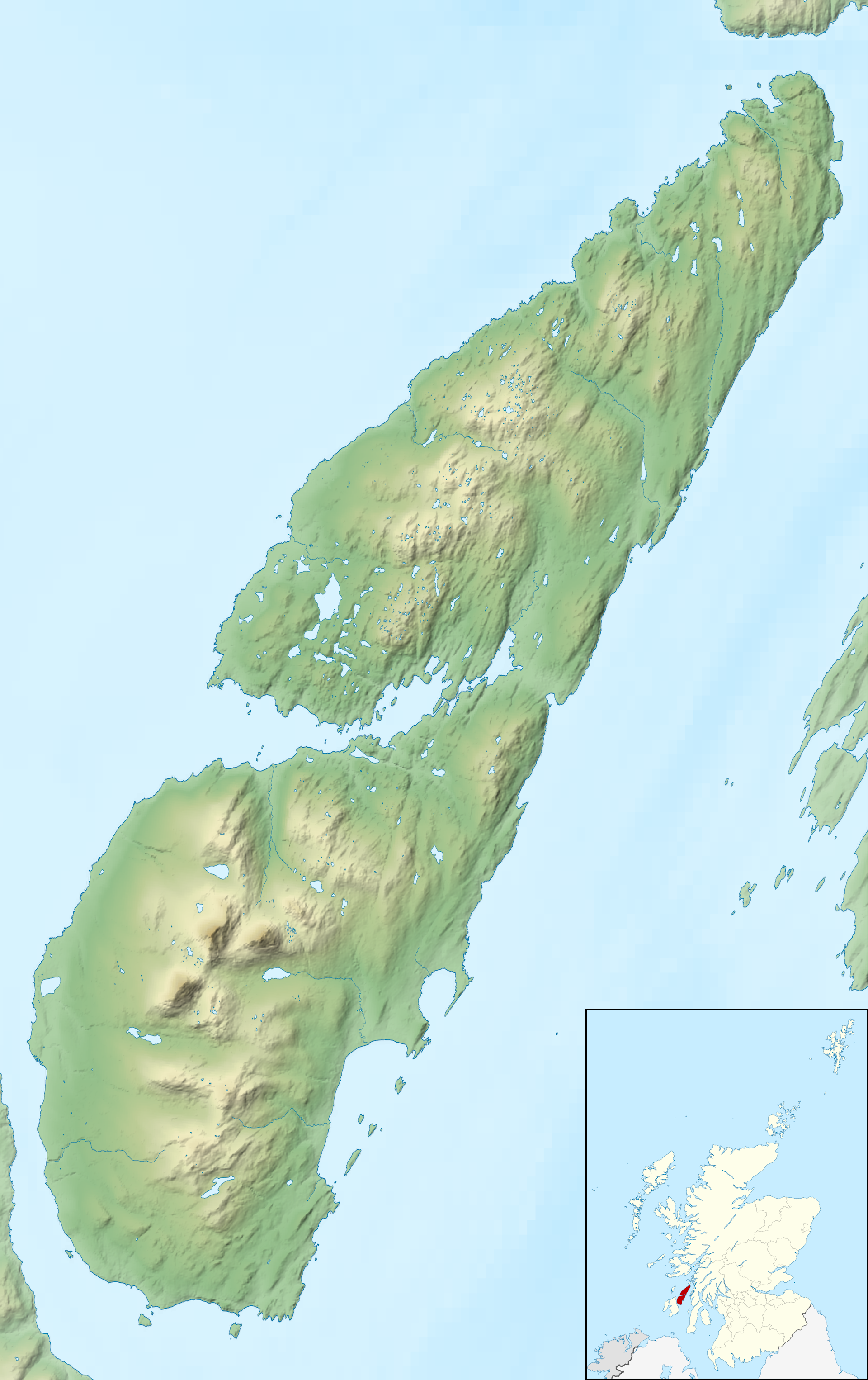
- Am Fraoch Eilean shown next to Jura Am Fraoch Eilean within Argyll and Bute
- OS grid reference: NM6105760026
- Coordinates: 55.791993°N 6.0378349°W

Name
- Name meaning: the heather isle

Physical geography
- Island group: Inner Hebrides
- Highest elevation: 20 m (66 ft)

Administration
- Council area: Argyll and Bute
- Country: Scotland
- Sovereign state: United Kingdom

Demographics
- Population: 0

Am Fraoch Eilean is an uninhabited island in the Sound of Jura, in the council area of Argyll and Bute, Scotland. It is 1 mile (2 kilometres) from Ardfin on Jura. Brosdale Island is located to the east. The name is Scottish Gaelic and means "the heather isle" and was formerly called "Ellan Charne". The ruins of Claig Castle are on Am Fraoch Eilean.
