= John Mercer (archaeologist) =

John Barry Mercer (1934 –July 1982) was a British archaeologist, author, weaver, and human rights advocate.

Born in Las Palmas, Canary Islands, to British parents, he was educated in Spain and England. Having qualified as a chartered accountant by the age of 21, he worked for Price Waterhouse in Paris for a couple of years and then dropped out, first to Ibiza and then Menorca. Following his passion for islands, he subsequently moved to Lealt, a remote house on the Scottish island of Jura in the Inner Hebrides where, in the 1960s and 70s with his partner Susan Searight, he researched and painstakingly excavated numerous coastal sites. His many papers have established Jura as a significant Mesolithic area. Whilst at Lealt, as well as his archaeological work, he lived off-grid, built his own loom from driftwood, invented a spinning wheel from recycled parts, and established a workshop to spin, dye and weave the local blackface wool into rugs.

He was a committed human rights researcher and activist, particularly in the Western Sahara and Mauritania, contributing influential research reports to the Minority Rights Group and also the Anti-Slavery Society. His report on slavery in Mauritania has been widely cited. The John Mercer Human Rights Trust, set up after his death, commemorates this strand of his life.

Mercer's first books were for young people, Lizard Island Expedition and The Cormorant and the Stranger, drawing on his own experiences in the Balearics. He wrote an illustrated guidebook to the islands of Colonsay, Gigha and Jura and several books on the Canary Islands. An independent thinker with eclectic interests, he also wrote about, amongst other topics, hand-spinning, communes, and Scottish devolution.

He was a Fellow of the Institute of Linguists, of the Royal Scottish Geographical Society, and of the Society of Antiquaries of Scotland.

John Mercer died from motor neurone disease at Lealt at the age of 48.

== Selected bibliography ==
=== Books ===
- Lizard Island Expedition, Oliver and Boyd, 1965
- The Cormorant and the Stranger, Deutsch, 1971
- Canary Islands: Fuerteventura, David & Charles, 1973
- Hebridean Islands: Colonsay, Gigha, Jura, Blackie, 1974
- Spanish Sahara, Allen & Unwin, 1976
- The Spinner's Workshop, Prism Press, 1978
- Scotland: the Devolution of Power, Platform Books, Calder, 1978
- The Sahwaris of Western Sahara, Minority Rights Group, 1979
- The Canary Islanders: their prehistory, conquest, and survival, Collings, 1980
- Slavery in Mauritania Today, Anti-Slavery Society, 1981, and also Edinburgh Human Rights Group 1982
- Communes: a Social History and Guide, Prism, 1984

=== Academic papers ===
- "Stone tools from a washing-limit deposit of the highest postglacial transgression, Lealt Bay, Isle of Jura", Proceedings of the Society of Antiquaries of Scotland (Proc Soc Antiq Scot), 100 (1967–8), 1–46.
- "Flint tools from the present tidal zone, Lussa Bay, Isle of Jura, Argyll", Proc Soc Antiq Scot, 102, (1969–70), 1–30.
- "A regression-time stone-workers' camp, 33 ft OD, Lussa River, Isle of Jura", Proc Soc Antiq Scot, 103 (1970-1), 1–32.
- "Roomed and Roomless Grain-Drying Kilns: the Hebridean Boundary?", Transactions of the Ancient Monuments Society (Trans Ancient Mon Soc), New Series, 19 (1972), 27–36.
- "Microlithic and Bronze Age camps, 75–26 ft OD, N Cam, Isle of Jura", Proc Soc Antiq Scot, 104 (1971–2), 1–22.
- "Glenbatrick Waterhole, a microlithic site on the Isle of Jura", Proc Soc Antiq Scot, 105 (1972-4), 9–32.
- "Lussa Wood I: the late-glacial and early post-glacial occupation of Jura", Proc Soc Antiq Scot, 110 (1979–80), 1–31.
- (with S. Searight) "Glengarrisdale: confirmation of Jura's third microlithic phase", Proc Soc Antiq Scot, 116 (1986), 41–55.
