= Ardlussa =

Coordinates: 56.0258629°N 5.7744207°W

Ardlussa: Scottish Gaelic: Àird Lusa
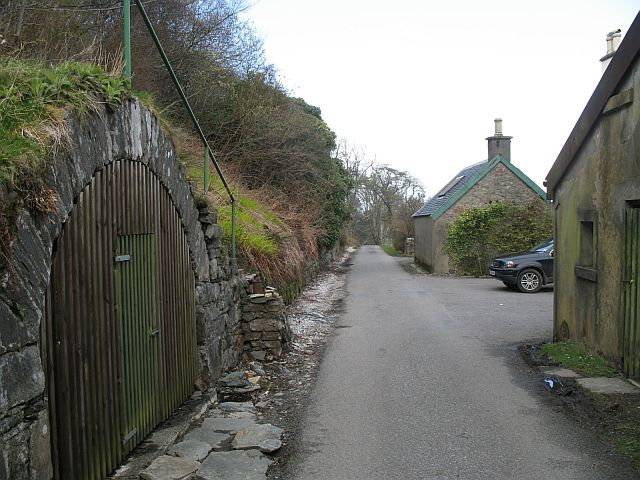

- Location within Argyll and Bute
- Council area: Argyll and Bute
- Country: Scotland
- Sovereign state: United Kingdom
- Police: Scotland
- Fire: Scottish
- Ambulance: Scottish

Ardlussa is a hamlet and estate on The Long Road, just north of the Lussa River, overlooking Ardlussa Bay on the east coast of the island of Jura, in the council area of Argyll and Bute, Scotland. Estate buildings line the road, and the area features semi-natural woodland. It lies 1.2 kilometres (0.75 mi) northeast of Inverlussa and 24 kilometres (15 mi) from Craighouse. Ardlussa is the home of Lussa Gin.

== History ==
The name "Ardlussa" is Gaelic/Norse and means "The point on the Lussa".
