= Ardfin =

Coordinates: 55°48′00″N 6°00′51″W

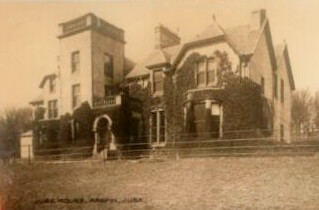
- Jura House, 19th century view

- Location within Argyll and Bute
- Council area: Argyll and Bute
- Country: Scotland
- Sovereign state: United Kingdom
- Police: Scotland
- Fire: Scottish
- Ambulance: Scottish

Ardfin is a country estate on the island of Jura, Inner Hebrides, Scotland. It is situated at the southern tip of the island, between Feolin and Craighouse. It includes Jura House which is a Category C listed building. The old house was extended by architect William Burn in 1838 for the laird Colin Campbell, with further extensions in 1878 by Alexander Ross and circa 1900 by Ronald Carswell. The next owners from 1938 were the Riley-Smith family, owners of John Smith's Brewery in Tadcaster, North Yorkshire. The estate was sold in 2010 after the death of Tony Riley-Smith. The gardens are home to specimen plants from Australasia, which were held in high regard by horticulturalists. The estate also includes 16 kilometres (10 mi) of coastline and seven islands over a total of 4,692.3 hectares (11,595 acres).

In November 2010, the Ardfin Estate was purchased by Greg Coffey, an Australian hedge fund manager. Jura House was doubled in size and clad in Portuguese limestone. Coffey closed the gardens to the public, and disposed of all livestock from the estate's working farm. The closure of the gardens aroused concern among island residents and visitors. In June 2012 it emerged that Coffey was planning a golf course on part of the estate. The course was completed and due to open in spring 2019, but the opening was delayed, and then delayed further by the coronavirus pandemic in 2020. Elsewhere on the estate, the former farm buildings were converted into a luxury hotel for the use of visiting golfers. A review made this comment about the private course: "Ardfin is intended to be an ultra exclusive investment, which will appeal to the golfer with the means to play this logistically difficult, but beautiful course".

== The KLF on the Ardfin Estate ==
On 23 August 1994, a disused boathouse on the Ardfin Estate was the location of K Foundation Burn a Million Quid, an event in which art group K Foundation burned an alleged million pounds in cash that they had earned as pop duo The KLF. The event was filmed, and was screened on Jura exactly a year after the burning.
