= Claig Castle =

Stronghold of the Clan Donald in Scotland

Coordinates: 55°47′29″N 6°2′7″W

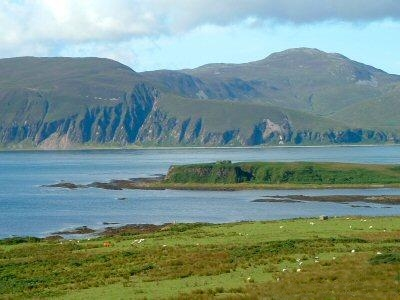
- The ruins in 2012
- Interactive map of the Claig Castle area

General information
- Location: Scotland

Claig Castle was a stronghold of the Clan Donald or MacDonald in the south of Scotland. It has been classified as a Category C listed building since 23 December 1988.

== History ==
The castle was once a massive fort described as a sea fortress, which allowed the Macdonald Lord of the Isles to dominate and control the sea traffic north and south through the Hebrides for more than four centuries.

The castle remained a stronghold of the MacDonalds until they were subdued in the 17th century by the Clan Campbell.

== Location ==
The castle is located at grid reference NR471627 on the island of Am Fraoch Eilean, just off the island of Jura. It occupies the eastern part of the island, separated from the remainder by a narrow gully, and survives as the ground floor of a tower house with traces of an enclosing bank and ditch.

== See also ==
- List of castles in Scotland
- Clan Donald
