= Jura, Scotland =

Island of the Inner Hebrides off Great Britain

Jura
Diùra [ˈtʲuːɾə] (Gaelic)
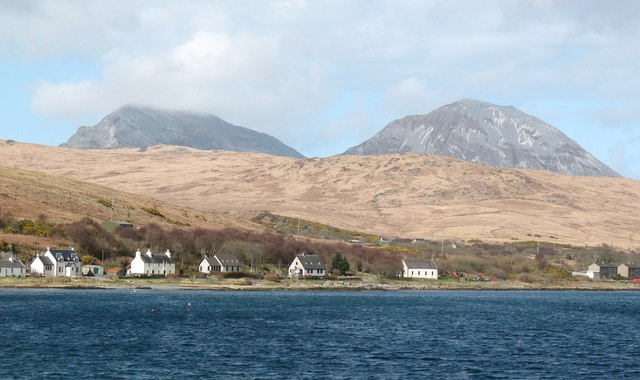
- Craighouse from the pier with the Paps of Jura in the background

Location
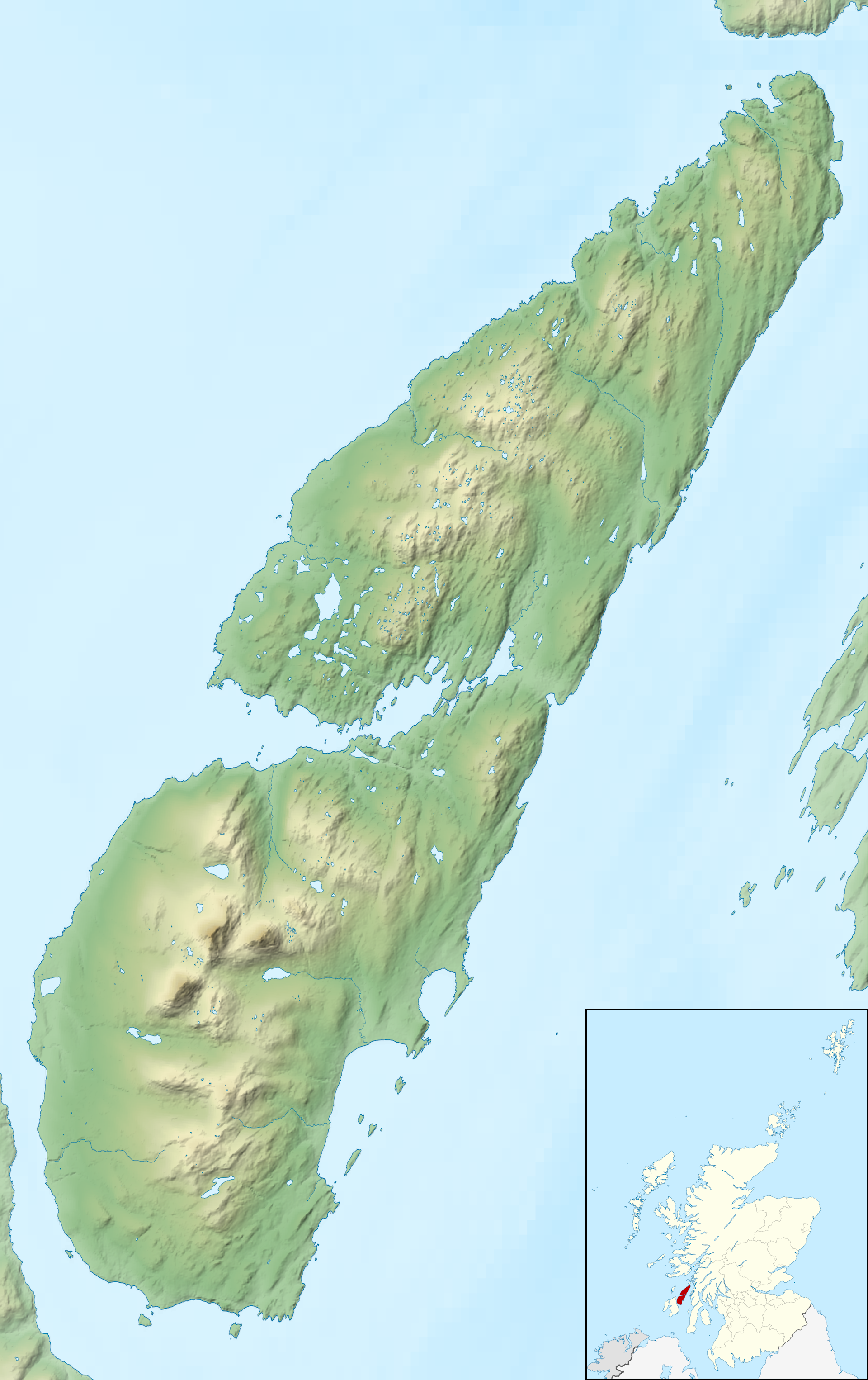
- Map of Jura & surrounding islands Jura shown within Argyll and Bute
- OS grid reference: NR589803
- Coordinates: 56°N 5.9°W

Name
- Name meaning: "deer island"
- Old Norse name: Dýrey

Physical geography
- Island group: Inner Hebrides
- Area: 366.92 km^{2} (142 sq mi)
- Area rank: 8
- Highest elevation: Beinn an Òir, 785 m (2,575 ft)

Administration
- Council area: Argyll and Bute
- Country: Scotland
- Sovereign state: United Kingdom

Demographics
- Population: 258
- Population rank: 29
- Population density: 0.7/km^{2} (1.8/sq mi)
- Largest settlement: Craighouse

Jura (/ˈdʒʊərə/ JOOR-ə; Scottish Gaelic: Diùra) is an island in the Inner Hebrides of Scotland, adjacent to and northeast of Islay. With an area of 36,692 hectares (142 sq mi), and 258 inhabitants recorded in the 2022 census, Jura is more sparsely populated than Islay, and is one of the least-densely populated islands of Scotland: in a list of the islands of Scotland ranked by size, Jura comes eighth, whereas by population it comes 29th. The island is mountainous, bare and largely infertile, covered by extensive areas of blanket bog.

The main settlement is the east coast village of Craighouse, on the Sound of Jura. The Jura distillery, producing Isle of Jura single-malt whisky, is in the village, as is the island's rum-distillery, which opened in 2021. Craighouse also houses the island's shop, church, primary school, the Jura hotel and bar, a gallery, craft shop, tearoom and the community-run petrol-pumps.

George Orwell (1903–1950) lived on Jura intermittently from 1946 to 1949 and completed his novel Nineteen Eighty-Four while living at a remote farmhouse.

Between Jura's northern tip and the island of Scarba lies the Gulf of Corryvreckan, where a whirlpool makes passage dangerous at certain states of the tide. The southern part of the island, from Loch Tarbert southwards, is a designated national scenic area (NSA), one of 40 such areas in Scotland. The Jura NSA covers 30,317 hectares (117 mi^{2}): 21,072 of land and 9,245 of adjacent sea.

== Geography ==
North of Craighouse are a number of small settlements on or near the east coast: Keils, Knockrome, Ardfernal, Lagg, Tarbert, Ardlussa (home of Lussa Gin) and Inverlussa. The west coast is unpopulated save for the south western corner at Feolin Ferry. Described as "the wildest island of the Inner Hebrides" it is all but bisected by West Loch Tarbet.

The three Paps of Jura dominate the landscapes of the south. The only road travels up the east coast, but ends well short of the northern tip, so walkers wishing to view the Corryvreckan whirlpool must complete the journey along a track.

=== Paps of Jura ===
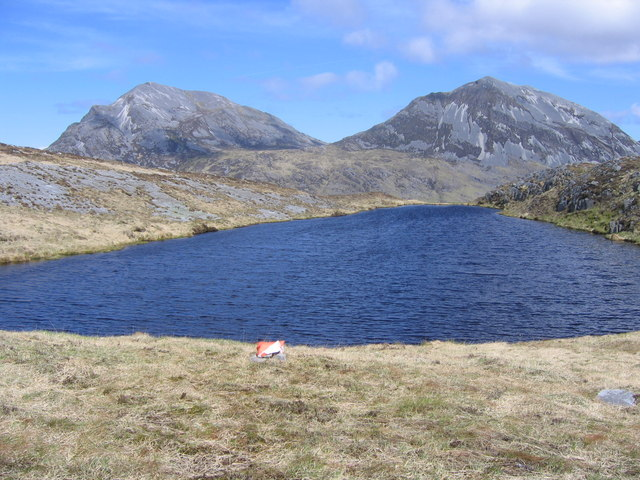
A view making clear how the Paps acquired their name, "paps" being an informal English word for breasts or teats.

The island is dominated by three steep-sided conical quartzite mountains on its western side, the Paps of Jura, which rise to 785 metres (2,575 ft). The term "pap" is often used for a breast-shaped hill. There are three major peaks:

- Beinn an Òir (Gaelic: 'mountain of gold') is the highest, standing at 785 metres (2,575 ft), and is thereby a Corbett.
- Beinn Shiantaidh (Gaelic: 'holy mountain') stands at 757 metres (2,484 ft) high.
- Beinn a' Chaolais (Gaelic: 'mountain of the kyle') is the lowest of the Paps, reaching 733 metres (2,405 ft).

The Paps dominate the landscape in the region and are visible from the Mull of Kintyre and, on a clear day, from the Isle of Skye and Northern Ireland. The route of the annual Isle of Jura Fell Race includes all three Paps and four other hills.

These hills were the subject of William McTaggart's 1902 painting The Paps of Jura, displayed in the Kelvingrove Art Gallery and Museum.

== Geology ==
Jura is composed largely of Dalradian quartzite, a hard metamorphic rock that provides the jagged surface of the Paps. On the western half of the island the quartzite has been penetrated by a number of linear basalt dykes that were formed during a period of intense volcanic activity in the early Palaeogene period, 56 million years ago. The dykes are most apparent on the west coast, where erosion of the less-resistant rock into which they are intruded has left them exposed as natural walls. The west coast also has a number of raised beaches, which are regarded as a geological feature of international importance.

== History ==
=== Early years ===
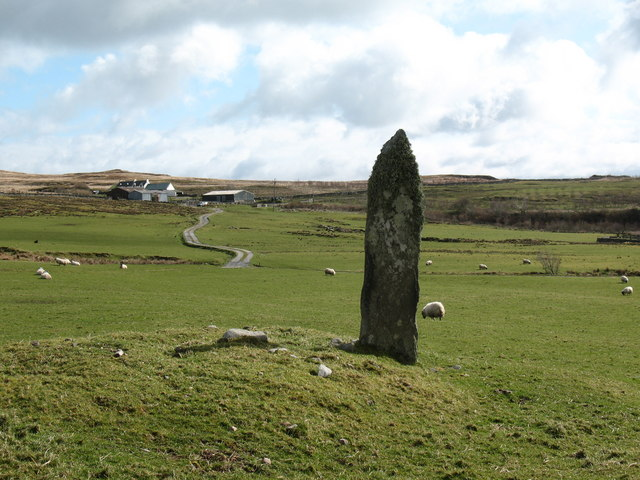
A Neolithic monument at Tarbert

Evidence of settlements on Jura dating from the Mesolithic period was first uncovered by the English archaeologist John Mercer in the 1960s. There is a Neolithic chambered cairn at Poll a' Cheo in the southwest of the island.

Jura is closer to Ireland's northern province of Ulster than it is to Glasgow, so it should not be unexpected that Irish people crossed the Straits of Moyle and established the Gaelic kingdom of Dál Riata. It was divided into a handful of regions, controlled by particular kin groups, of which the Cenél nÓengusa controlled Jura and Islay.

The kingdom thrived for a few centuries, and formed a springboard for Christianisation of the mainland. It is believed that Jura may have been Hinba, the island to which the 6th-century missionary, Columba, retreated from the monastic community he founded on Iona, when he wished for a more contemplative life.

=== Vikings ===
Dál Riata was ultimately destroyed when Vikings invaded, and established their own domain, spreading more extensively over the islands north and west of the mainland, including Jura. This became the Kingdom of the Isles, but following the unification of Norway, the islands were under tenuous Norwegian authority, somewhat resisted by local rulers, like Godred Crovan. Following Godred's death, the local population resisted Norway's choice of replacement, causing Magnus, the Norwegian king, to launch a military campaign to assert his authority. In 1098, under pressure from Magnus, the king of Scotland quitclaimed to him all sovereign authority over the isles.

To Norway, the islands became known as Suðreyjar (Old Norse, traditionally anglicised as Sodor), meaning southern isles. The former territory of Dal Riata acquired the geographic description Argyle (now Argyll): the Gaelic coast.

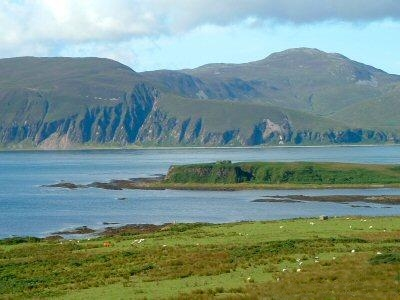
The remains of Claig Castle, a vital stronghold of Somerled

Half a century later, however, Somerled, the husband of Godred Crovan's granddaughter, led a successful revolt against Norway, transforming Suðreyjar into an independent kingdom. Somerled built the sea fortress of Claig Castle on an island at the southern tip of Jura, establishing control of the Sound of Islay; on account of the Corryvreckan whirlpool, this essentially gave him control of the sea traffic between the Scottish mainland and the Hebrides.

After his death, nominal Norwegian authority was re-established, but de facto authority was split between Somerled's sons and the Crovan dynasty. Somerled's son Dougall received the part of Jura north of Loch Tarbert (along with adjacent islands further north), while Dougal's nephew Donald received the rest of Jura, as well as Islay, and lands to the east. It is unclear why Jura was split like this, but it may have been connected to a dispute with Donald's other uncle, Angus, who Donald and his brother had ultimately dispossessed.

In the mid 13th century, increased tension between Norway and Scotland led to a series of battles, culminating in the Battle of Largs, shortly after which the Norwegian king died. In 1266, his more peaceable successor ceded his nominal authority over Suðreyjar to the Scottish king (Alexander III) by the Treaty of Perth, in return for a very large sum of money. Alexander generally acknowledged the semi-independent authority of Somerled's heirs.

=== Lords of the Isles ===
At the end of the 13th century, king John Balliol was challenged for the throne by Robert de Bruys. By this point, Somerled's descendants had formed into three families: the heirs of Dougall (the MacDougalls), those of Donald (the MacDonalds), and those of Donald's brother (the MacRory); the MacDougalls took John's side, while the MacDonalds and MacRory backed de Bruys. When de Bruys defeated John, he declared the MacDougall lands forfeit, and gave them to the MacDonalds. John of Islay, the head of the MacDonald family married the heir of the MacRory family, thereby acquiring the remaining share of Somerled's realm, and transforming it into the Lordship of the Isles, which lasted for over a century.

Throughout all this time, the descendants of the Cenél nÓengusa had retained their identity; they were now the MacInnes (not to be confused with similarly named groups elsewhere in Scotland). Though the MacDougalls had had authority over part of Jura, the MacInnes had been left in unmolested possession of the land, as vassals. Now, however, with the MacDonalds in charge of the entire island, the situation changed. The head of the MacDonalds was unhappy to have tenants who had supported John Balliol and the MacDougalls, so, in 1358, he asked the chief of the MacLean family to assassinate the MacInnes' leaders; so thorough was this carried out that to this day the MacInnes have had no-one to become their new chief, and consequently they dispersed throughout Scotland.

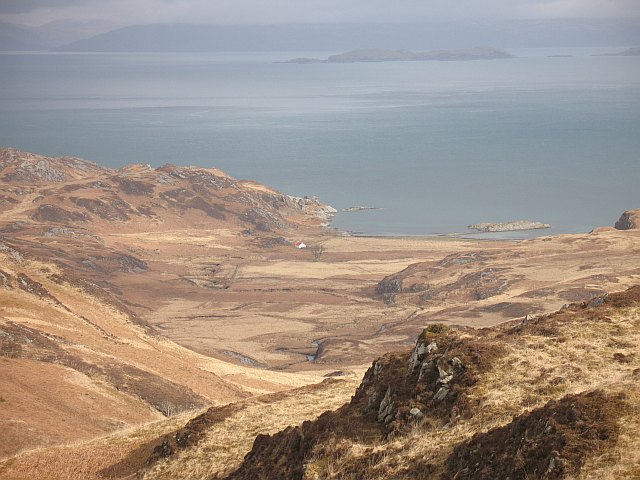
Glen Garrisdale, the site of Aros Castle

In 1390, Donald Macdonald, Lord of the Isles, granted the MacLeans the lands of northern Jura (the lands which had belonged to the MacInnes). The MacLeans established a castle in Glen Garrisdale, as a stronghold, which they named Aros Castle, like one of their castles elsewhere.

Towards the end of the 15th century, the Lords of the Isles made increasing efforts to establish full independence. John MacDonald, the then Lord, launched a severe raid on Ross, in pursuance of this aim. Within 2 years of the raid, in 1493, the Lordship of the Isles was declared forfeit, and his realm became part of Scotland, rather than a dependency of the Scottish crown. John was exiled from his former lands, and his former subjects now considered themselves to have no superior except the king. A charter was soon sent from the Scottish King confirming this state of affairs; the charter declares that Skye and the Outer Hebrides are to be considered independent from the rest of the former Lordship, leaving only Islay and Jura remaining.

=== Campbells ===
Initially, the MacDonalds of Dunnyveg remained landlords of the southern part of Jura. Following John MacDonald's death, his grandson and heir, Black Donald, was being kept a prisoner at Innes Chonnel Castle (a stronghold of the Campbells). In 1501, Donald escaped, triggering an insurrection in his favour in parts of the former Lordship of the Isles. When Donald was recaptured, in 1506, the king took the precaution of transferring the property of the MacDonald family to the Campbells; in Jura, the Campbells of Craignish were the beneficiaries.

The Campbells established a base for themselves at Ardfin, at the south of Jura, to replace the nearby MacDonald stronghold of Claig Castle. After a century of intermittent violence between the families, in 1607 the Campbells purchased from the MacDonalds a quitclaim of any rights the latter might have on Jura.

Following the Scottish reformation, the MacLeans (opponents) and Campbells (supporters) came into dispute; to a certain extent, the Campbells also saw it as an opportunity for territorial expansion. Having complained for several years about harassment from the MacLeans, in 1647 the Campbells launched a surprise attack on Aros Castle, and killed many MacLeans; for many years in the 20th century, a human skull stood on a ledge in a nearby cave, and it was traditionally said to have been the remains of a Maclean who had been killed in this battle. The skull is no longer there, but the latest editions of Ordnance Survey maps still mark the location as 'Maclean's Skull Cave'.

The north of the island, however, remained in MacLean hands until 1737, when it was sold to Donald MacNeil of Colonsay. The remainder of the island was ruled and largely owned by the Campbells for a total of three centuries, by 11 successive Campbell lairds. Under Campbell influence, shrieval authority was established under the sheriff of Argyll. With inherited Campbell control of the sheriffdom, comital authority was superfluous, and the provincial identity (medieval Latin:provincia) of Islay-Jura faded away. In the mid 18th century, The Heritable Jurisdictions Act abolished both, leaving only the shrieval unit, and without Campbell control.

According to a local legend, in the early 1700s, the Campbells of Jura evicted a man who prophesied that the last Campbell to leave the island would be one-eyed with his belongings carried in a cart drawn by a lone white horse. In 1938 Charles Campbell, blind in one eye from a war injury, fell on hard times and led his white horse to the old pier for the last time.

=== Emigration ===
Beginning in the later 18th century, long before the notorious Highland Clearances of the following century, there were several waves of emigration from Jura. In 1767, fifty people left for Canada, and from then the population fluctuated, rising to a peak of 1,312 in 1831, before gradually shrinking to its 20th century level of just a few hundred. Mercer notes that although relatively few forced clearances on Jura were recorded, the emigrations were due to factors such as hunger and spiralling rents.

=== Recent history ===
Census records show that Jura's population peaked at 1,312 in 1831, and that, in common with many areas of western Scotland, the island's population declined steadily over the ensuing decades. However, there has been a small increase since 2001. During the decade from 2001 to 2011 Scottish island populations as a whole grew by 4% to 103,702. Alongside the long-term decline in Jura's population has been a decline in the number of Gaelic speakers. The 1881 census reported that 86.6% of 946 inhabitants spoke Gaelic. In 1961, for the first time less than half (46.9%) spoke the language and by 2001, this figure had dropped to 10.6%.

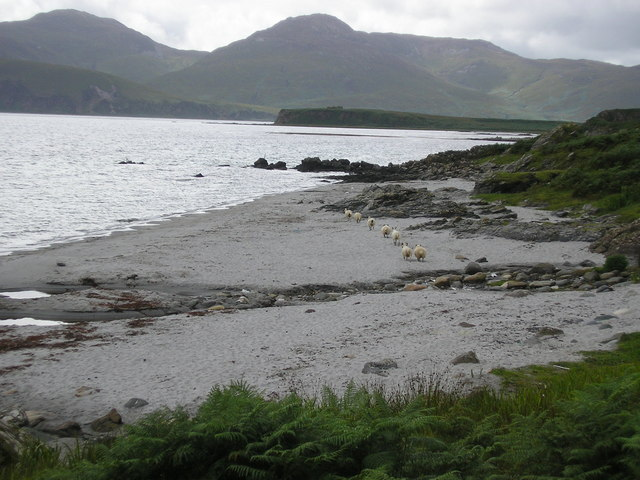
The beach below Jura House, Isle of Islay in the distance.

In 1838, the old Campbell mansion at Ardfin was remodelled and extended by the architect William Burn for the laird Colin Campbell and renamed Jura House.

The Annual Reports of the Fishery Board for Scotland provide an insight into the state of fishing from Jura in the years before the First World War.

Fishery Statistics

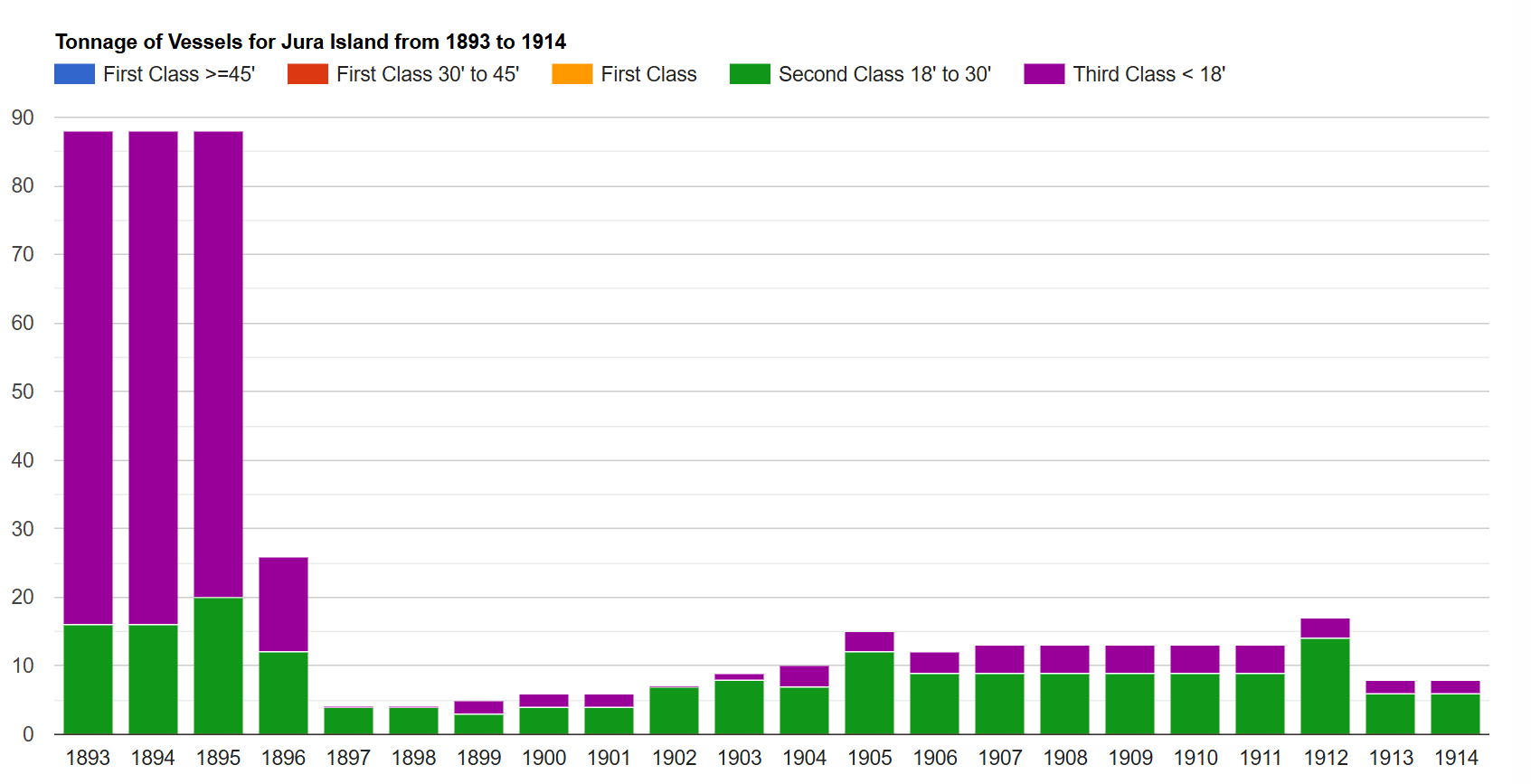
Tonnage of vessels

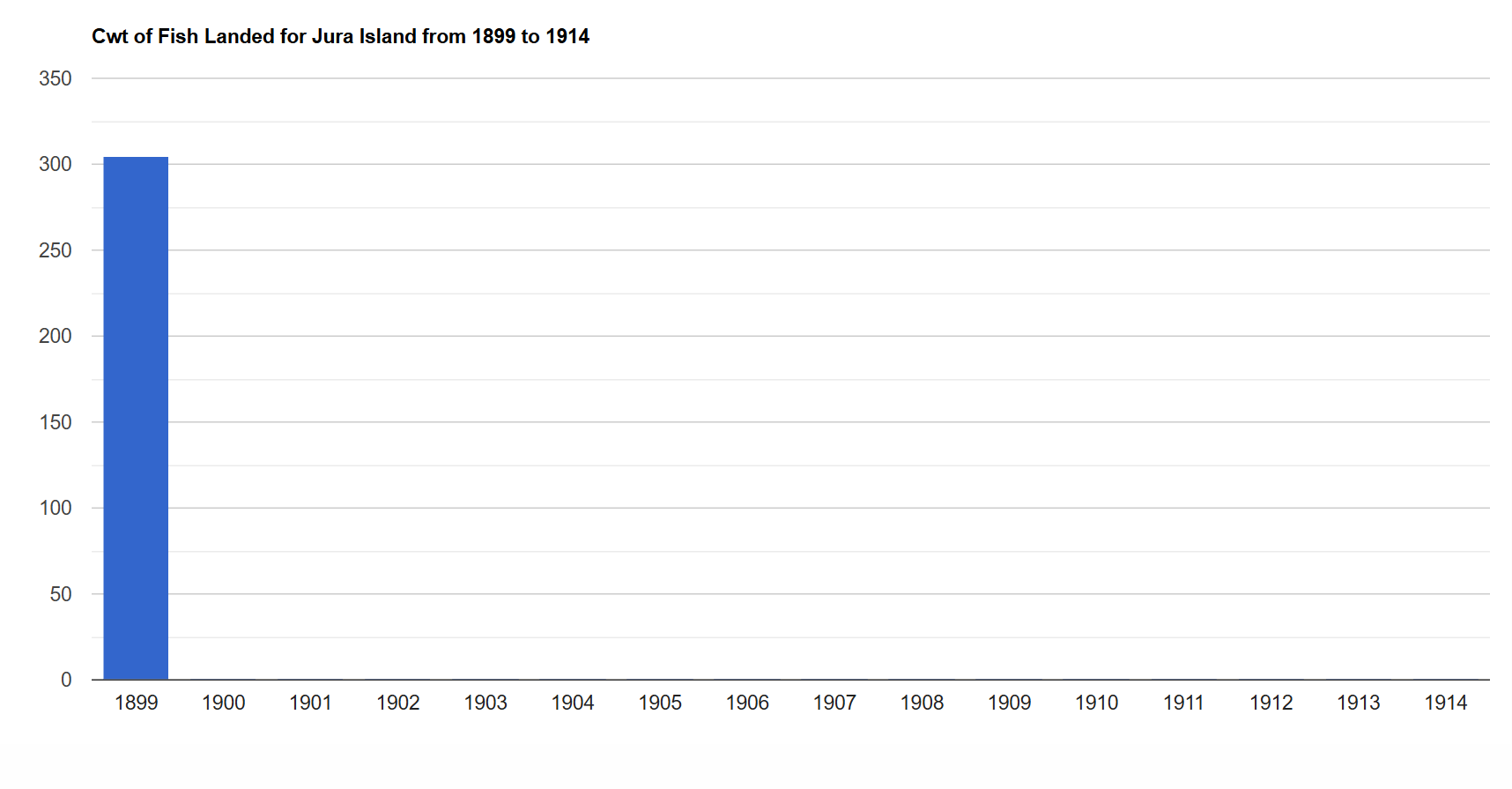
Cwt of fish landed

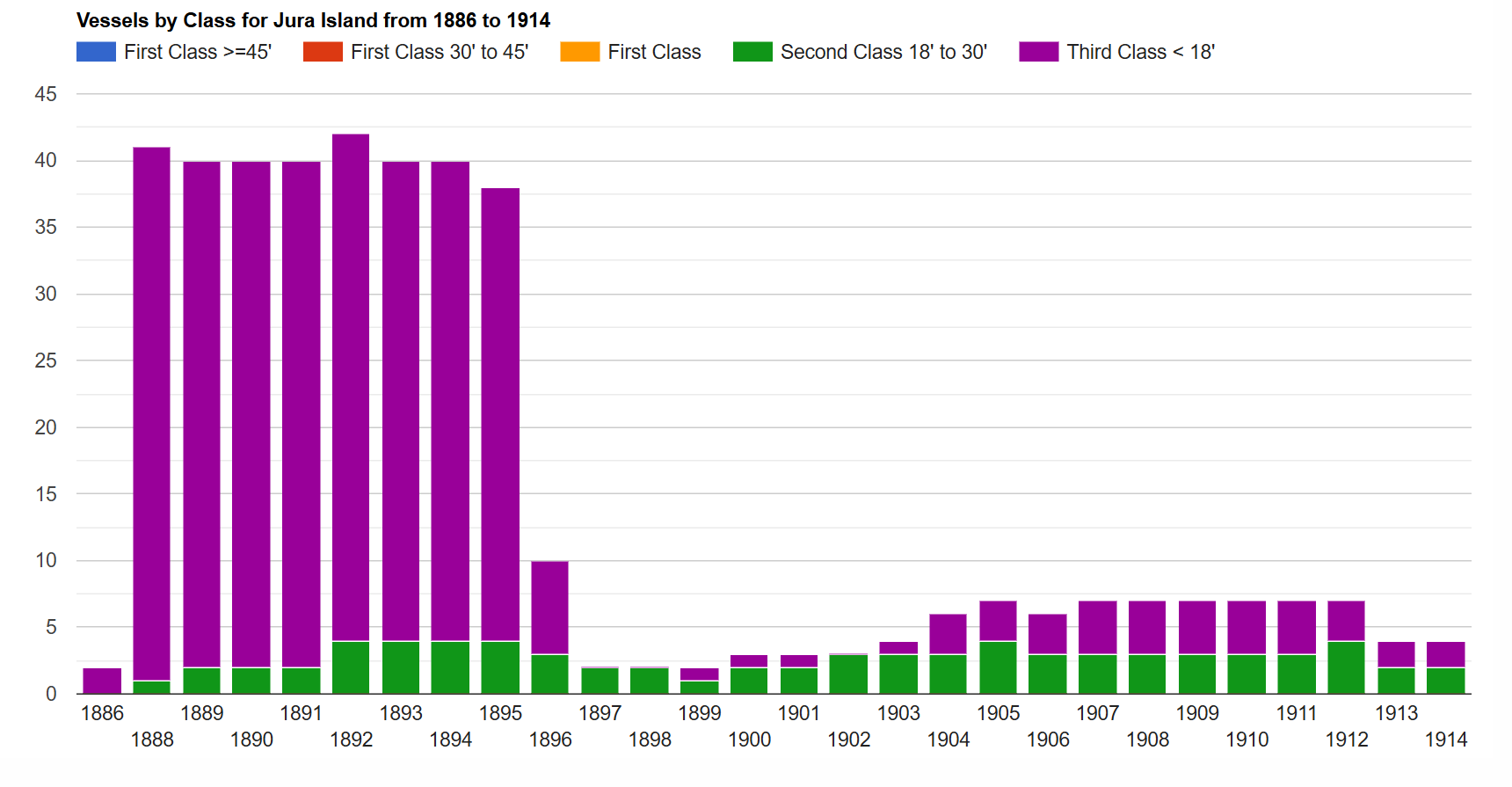
Vessels by class

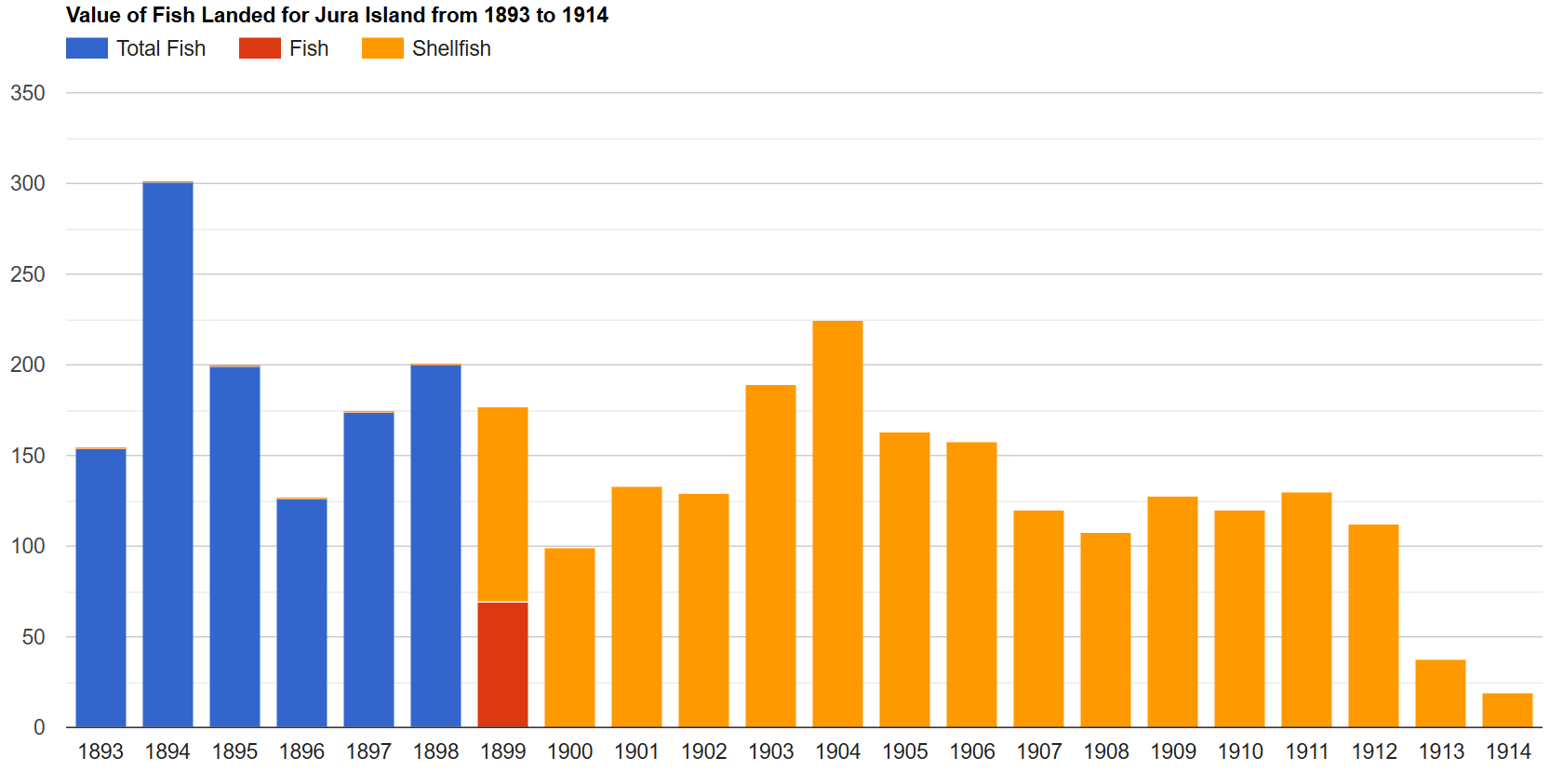
Value (£) of fish landed

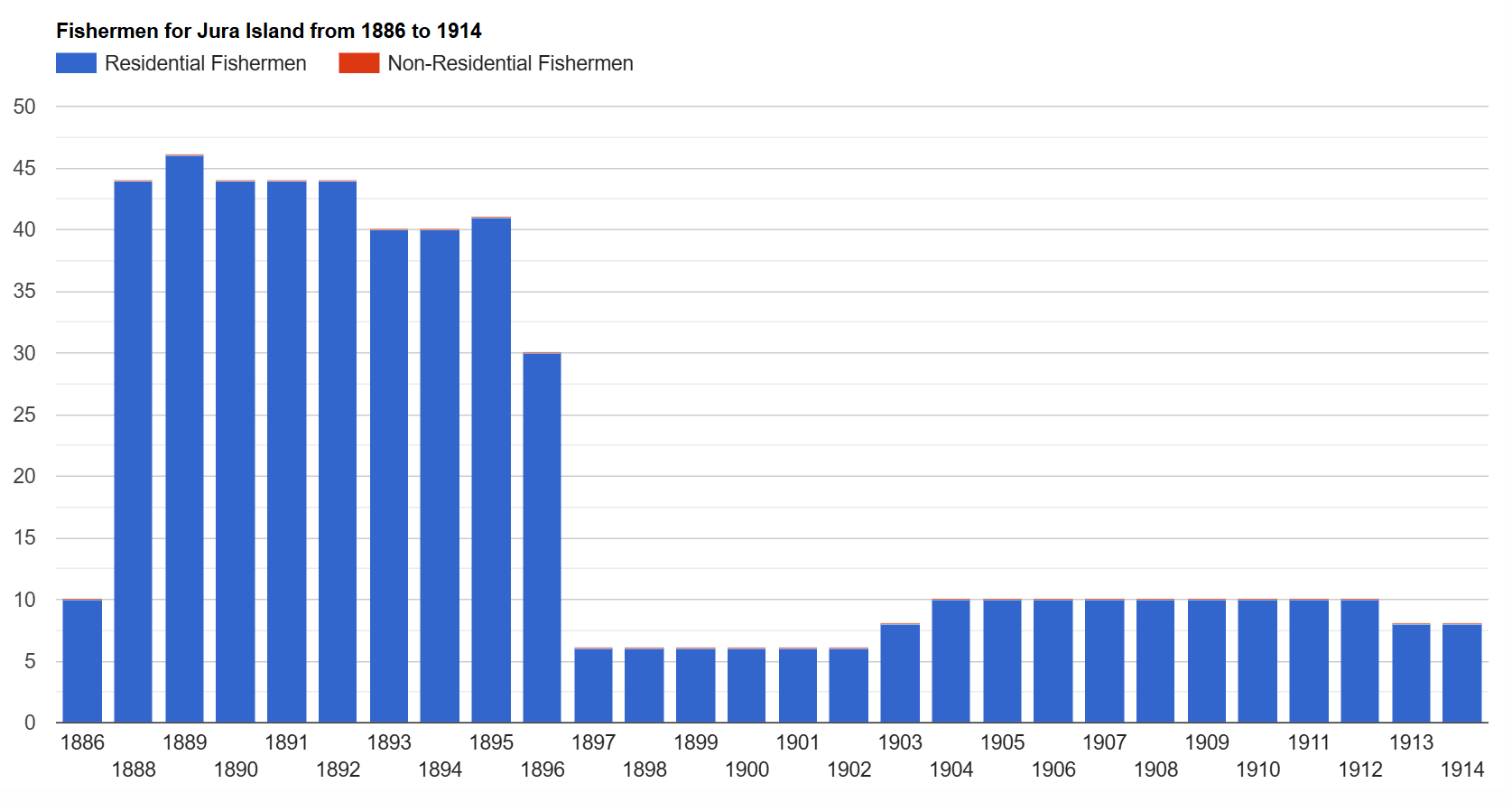
Fishermen

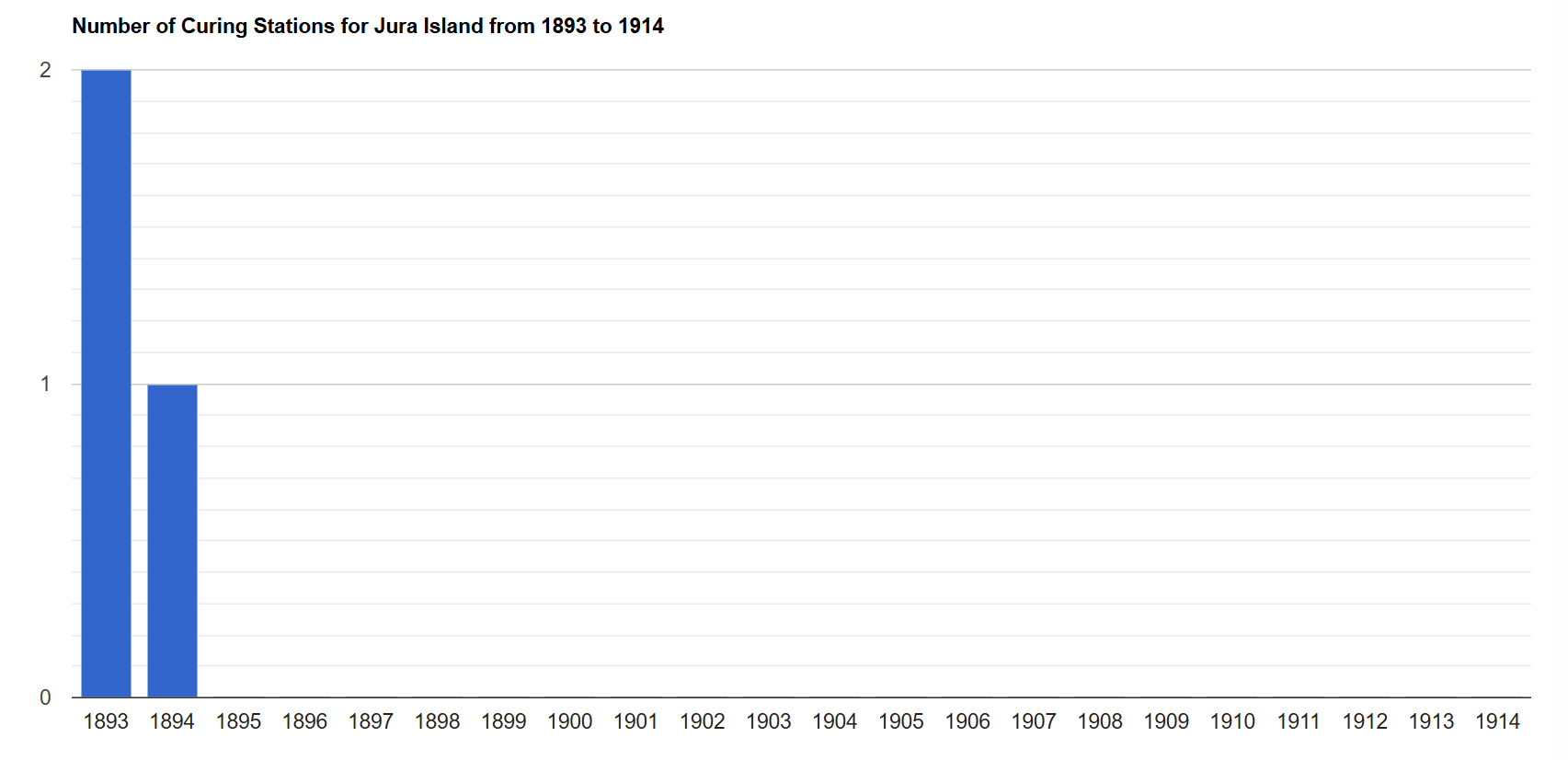
Number of curing stations

During the first half of the 20th century, the Campbells gradually sold the island as a number of separate estates, beginning with the disposal in 1920 of the northern two-thirds of the island, from the Paps of Jura and the Corran River all the way to the Corryvreckan. The purchaser was the American-born English politician Waldorf Astor, whose wife Nancy Astor had recently become the first female MP to sit in the House of Commons. The most southerly part of that acquisition, the Tarbert Estate, remains in the hands of the Astor family to this day, and in recent years the latest generation of Astors have restored the remote Glenbatrick Lodge, which stands on Jura's uninhabited west coast, on the shore of Loch Tarbert. The connection between the Campbell family of landowners and lairds and Jura ended in 1938 with the sale of Jura House and its surrounding land, Ardfin Estate.

== George Orwell on Jura ==
In his later life, George Orwell moved to Barnhill, on Jura, living there intermittently from 1946. During that time he was critically ill with tuberculosis. Orwell left Jura in January 1949 to get treatment at a sanatorium in Gloucestershire and never returned to the island.

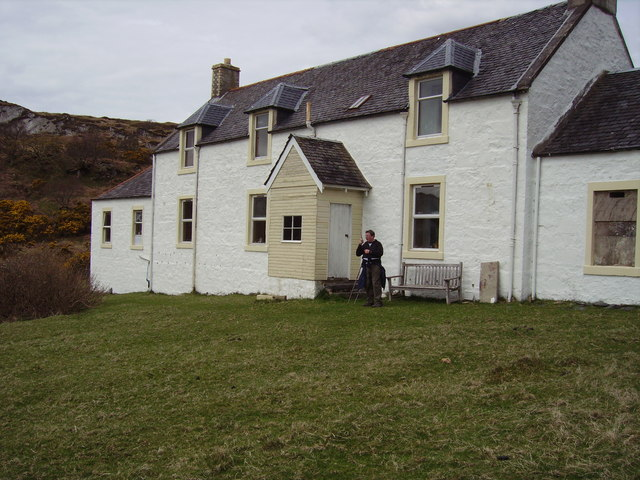
Barnhill

He was known to the residents of Jura by his real name, Eric Blair. He completed Nineteen Eighty-Four at Barnhill during 1947–48; he sent the final typescript to his publishers, Secker and Warburg, on 4 December 1948, and they published the book on 8 June 1949. Despite its isolation, Barnhill has in recent years become something of a shrine for his readers.

During his time on Jura, Orwell and his adopted son, Richard Blair, a niece and a nephew, nearly lost their lives at the Corryvreckan. He was attempting to navigate the Gulf when the outboard motor fell off the boat. The nephew rowed them to Eilean Mòr, where the boat overturned as they were disembarking; the group was rescued by the crew of a lobster boat.

Still owned by the Fletcher family who had rented it to Orwell, the four bedroom Barnhill house is available for rent but is somewhat primitive for this era. A generator supplies electricity, the small refrigerator is gas-powered and heat is provided by a coal-fired Rayburn. The original look and feel of the house has been retained. "If you stay here, you're really treading in Orwell's footsteps. He would recognise the place instantly if he were to step through the door today," Orwell Society member Damaris Fletcher told The Guardian.

== Government and politics ==
In 1899, counties were formally created, on shrieval boundaries, by a Scottish Local Government Act, under which Jura became part of the County of Argyll. In 1975 the counties were replaced by a two-tier system of regions and districts: Jura formed part of the Argyll and Bute district within the wider Strathclyde region, however the County of Argyll continues in use as a registration county. A further re-organisation took place in 1995, and Jura now forms part of the unitary council area of Argyll and Bute. The island also has a community council, which is responsible primarily for representing the views of the local community in dealings with other public bodies, although it can also undertake other activities such as fundraising for local projects and the running of community events.

In the Scottish Parliament Jura forms part of the constituency of Argyll and Bute, which elects one Member of the Scottish Parliament (MSP) by the first past the post method of election. It is also one of eight constituencies in the Highlands and Islands electoral region, which elects seven additional members, in addition to the eight constituency MSPs, to produce a form of proportional representation for the region as a whole.

The current MSP for Argyll and Bute is Jenni Minto of the Scottish National Party (SNP), who was elected in 2021, taking over from her party colleague Michael Russell.

At Westminster, Jura is represented as part of the constituency of Argyll, Bute and South Lochaber, which is held by Brendan O'Hara, also of the SNP.

== Modern ownership ==
There are now seven estates on Jura and a whisky distillery, all in separate ownership.

- Ardfin: situated at the southern tip of the island, between Feolin and Craighouse. For some 70 years from 1938, Ardfin belonged to the Riley-Smith family, brewers from Tadcaster in Yorkshire. In 2010 the estate was bought by Greg Coffey, an Australian hedge fund manager, and since 2011 its ownership has been with Ardfin Lodge Ltd of Jersey. The famous walled garden of Jura House, which had previously been a noted horticultural asset and popular tourist attraction, was permanently closed to the public. Having also wound up the estate's farm, Greg Coffey then submitted proposals for the construction of a private 18-hole golf course on the estate. The original Jura House was extended and modernised, and the former farm buildings were converted into an elite luxury hotel for the use of visiting golfers. The course was completed in 2018 and opened in 2019. The hotel was due to open at Easter 2020 but the opening has been delayed.

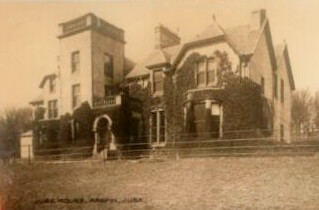
Jura House on the Ardfin Estate in the 19th Century

- Inver: lying North of Ardfin, on the west flanks of the Paps of Jura, and belonging to Sir William Lithgow, Vice-chairman of the Glasgow shipbuilding group Lithgows.
- Jura Forest: also lying north of Ardfin, but on the east flanks of the Paps of Jura. Forest Estate belongs to the Vestey family, which was headed until 2021 by Samuel, 3rd Baron Vestey, chairman of the food and farming business Vestey Group Ltd, and a former Master of the Horse of the Royal Household. The owner is now his eldest son William Vestey, 4th Baron Vestey.
- Tarbert: North of the Corran River, and stretching as far as Loch Tarbert, the Tarbert Estate has been in the hands of the Astor family for over 100 years (see 'Recent History'). The present Lord Astor is William Astor, 4th Viscount Astor, but the owner of the estate is listed as Altar Properties Ltd of the British Virgin Islands, whose beneficial owners are Viscount Astor's three children, Flora, Will and James. Former Prime Minister and Foreign Secretary David Cameron has visited the estate on several occasions, as Lord Astor is the stepfather of his wife Samantha Cameron.
- Ruantallain: immediately north of Loch Tarbert. Ruantallain had been a part of the Tarbert Estate, until its sale in 1984. It is owned by businessman Lindsay Bury, who is a former president of the influential wildlife charity Flora and Fauna International.

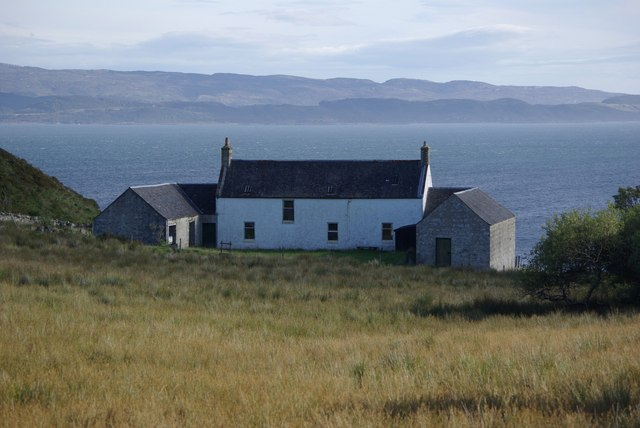
Barnhill

- Ardlussa: north of Ruantallain. In 1926 the Ardlussa and Barnhill Estates were acquired from the Astors by Walter Hargreaves-Brown. The present owner of Ardlussa is Andrew Fletcher, great-grandson of Hargreaves-Brown. Fletcher lives at Ardlussa House with his family – they are the only estate owners to be permanently resident on Jura.
- Barnhill: at the northernmost tip of Jura, overlooking the famous Corryvreckan Whirlpool, George Orwell completed his novel Nineteen Eighty-Four while living here. Barnhill is also owned by a member of the Fletcher family.

Jura distillery was founded in 1810 but was not used after 1900 and was dismantled. In 1963, two estate owners, Robin Fletcher of Ardlussa and Tony Riley-Smith of Ardfin, took over the old property and built a modern distillery; they expanded it in 1978. In 1985, Invergordon Distillers bought Mackinlays; later the two companies became part of Whyte & Mackay.

There is also a relatively small area owned by Forestry and Land Scotland.

== Economy ==
In an economic survey published in 2005 by the now-defunct Feolin Study Centre on Jura, the gross turnover of the island was estimated to be just over £3.2 million. This figure covered production and services only, and took no account of public expenditure by government or local authority. In financial terms, the Jura distillery was the largest, and it was also the biggest individual employer, but the island's seven estates, taken together, employed the most full- and part-time staff. The distillery is owned by Whyte and Mackay, which in 2014 was taken over by Emperador Distillers, part of the Alliance Global Group Inc of the Philippines. The estates provide deer stalking and other field sports, together with forestry and a diminishing amount of agriculture.

In 2015 a new distillery was established in Ardlussa at the north of the island, producing Lussa Gin, and in 2021 the island's first rum distillery opened in Craighouse producing Deer Island Rum. Both are small batch, locally owned distilleries.

While tourism plays an important part in the island of economy (in 2005 over 20% of the island population was directly or indirectly employed in the tourist industry), its role was affected by the 2020–22 pandemic and remote working has encouraged more diverse work roles on the island including work in the digital and creative industries, despite a sub standard internet connection in many areas. In 2005 the distillery, field sports and Jura House Gardens were listed as the main tourist attractions, although the gardens have since been closed to the public. A new gin distillery and visitor centre at Ardlussa and a new rum distillery in Craighouse are now in operation and contribute to a growing number of businesses engaged in small scale food and drink production on Jura. Meanwhile, the landscape and wildlife continues to be among the island's significant attractions. Conde Nast Traveller suggested that visitors would appreciate the many red deer, "and the distinctive Paps of Jura rise above miles of blanket bog and freshwater lochans" as well as the "remote bays and bothies" or the boat trips to the Corryvreckan whirlpool. The Rough Guides book adds that there is a hotel and some bed and breakfast accommodation on the island, which is "an ideal place to go for peace and quiet and some great walking". Several of the island's landowners continue a more exclusive tourist offer, based around field sports on several of the estates, and the luxury hotel and golf courses at Ardfin.

With two townships on Jura at Keils and Knockrome & Ardfarnal, modern diverse crofting plays an important role on the island, and while it doesn't economically sustain any households on its own, it has been a significant contributor to the rise in population, facilitating young families and new housing on the island.

In 2013 Jura Development Trust secured financial support from the Big Lottery Fund and other sources to purchase the island's only shop, which re-opened as a community-owned business in 2014. The trust is also exploring renewable energy options.

In 2018 a new business hub opened in Craighouse consisting of four units adjacent to the community petrol pumps. These currently house three local businesses – a photography gallery, Deer Island rum distillery, and a craft shop – as well as the local bus garage.

Since 2019 the Highlands and Islands Transport Partnership (HITRANS) have had an office in Craighouse which houses the Scottish Islands Passport project.

== Transport ==
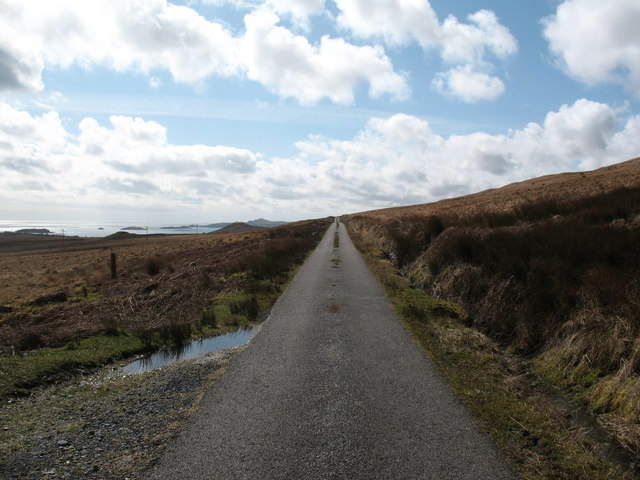
The road

During the summer the island has a direct passenger ferry link between Craighouse on Jura and Tayvallich on the Scottish mainland. The service is privately operated with funding secured by the Jura Development Trust.

Throughout the year the MV Eilean Dhiura runs a regular service between Feolin on Jura and Port Askaig on Islay, with frequent sailings from 7.30am to 6.30pm Mon-Sat and a reduced Sunday schedule. This service is run by Argyll and Bute Council.

From Islay there are ferry connections to Kennacraig, Colonsay and Oban (all operated by Caledonian MacBrayne) and a seasonal connection to Ballycastle in Northern Ireland (from Port Ellen). Flights from Islay airport also offer connections to Glasgow Airport via Loganair and to Oban and Colonsay via Hebridean Air Services.

Jura has only one road of any significance, the single-track A846, which follows the southern and eastern coastline of the island from Feolin Ferry to Craighouse, a distance of around 8 miles (13 km). The road then continues to Lagg, Tarbert, Ardlussa and beyond. A private track runs from the road end to the far north of the island (no vehicle access to the general public). A local bus service on the island is operated by Garelochhead Coaches.

Five electric vehicle charging points are available on Jura. One at the whisky distillery, two in the Village Hall Carpark and two at the commercial units towards the pier, adjacent to the petrol / diesel pumps.

== Wildlife and conservation ==
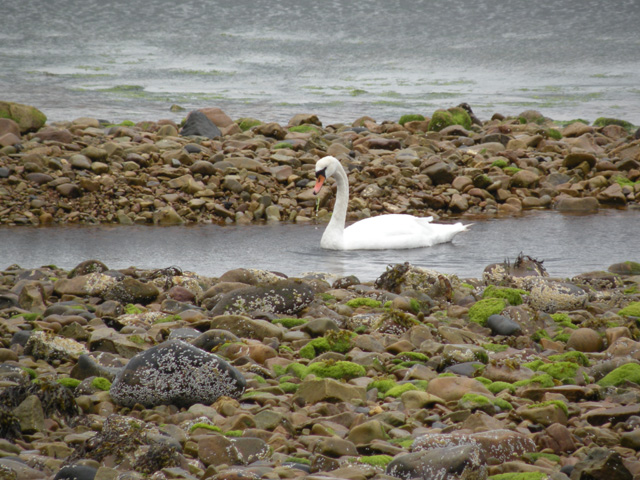
A Mute Swan, on Jura

Jura National Scenic Area
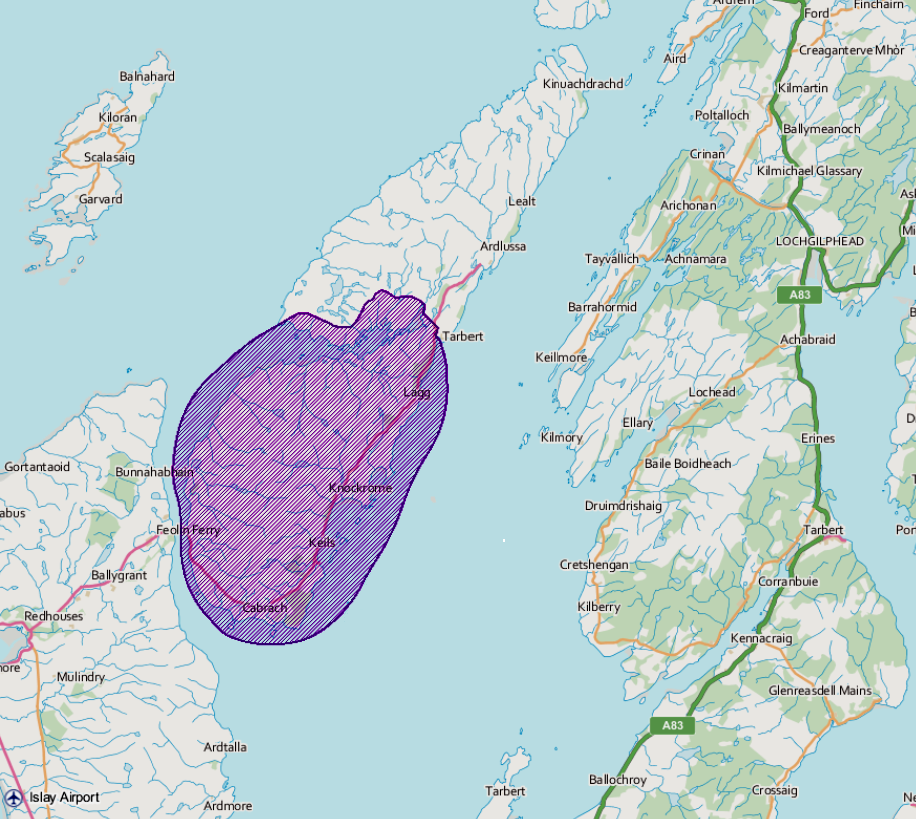
- A map of the Jura National Scenic Area
- Interactive map of Jura National Scenic Area
- Location: Argyll and Bute, Scotland
- Area: 303 km^{2} (117 sq mi)
- Established: 1981
- Governing body: NatureScot

The island has a large population of red deer. Through browsing, the deer prevent the vegetation on the island from turning back to woodland, which is the natural climax community; indeed an alternative explanation of the island's name is that it derives from 'the great quantity of yew trees which grew in the island' in earlier times.

Jura is also noted for its bird life, and especially for its raptors, including buzzards, golden eagles, white-tailed eagles and hen harriers. Since 2010 Jura has been designated by NatureScot as a Special Protection Area for golden eagles. Like many other parts of the Hebrides and western Scotland, the shores of Jura are frequented by grey seals, and the elusive otter is also relatively common here, as is the adder, the UK's only venomous snake. The seas around Jura form part of the Inner Hebrides and the Minches Special Area of Conservation due to their importance for Harbour porpoises.

== Literary accounts ==
In 1549, Donald Monro, Dean of the Isles, wrote that the island was "ane ather fyne forrest for deire, inhabit and manurit at the coist syde", with "fresche water Loches, with meikell of profit" and an abundance of salmon. (Note: Translation from Scots: "another fine deer forest, manured and inhabited at the coast" and "freshwater lakes, with much profit".)

However, when the soldier and military historian Sir James Turner visited Jura in 1632, he was less impressed, reporting that '[it is] a horride ile and a habitation fit for deere and wild beastes'.

But at the end of the 17th century, the writer and traveller Martin Martin went there and concluded that 'this isle is perhaps the wholesomest plot of ground either in the isles or continent of Scotland, as appears by the long life of the natives and their state of health'. Martin noted some extraordinary examples of longevity, including one Gillouir MacCrain, who was alleged to have kept one hundred and eighty Christmases in his own house. And he was impressed by the good health of the inhabitants: 'There is no epidemical disease that prevails here. Fevers are but seldom observed by the natives, and any kind of flux is rare. The gout and agues are not so much as known by them, neither are they liable to sciatica. Convulsions, vapours, palsies, surfeits, lethargies, megrims, consumptions, rickets, pains of the stomach or coughs, are not frequent here, and none of them are at any time observed to become mad.'

== Culture ==
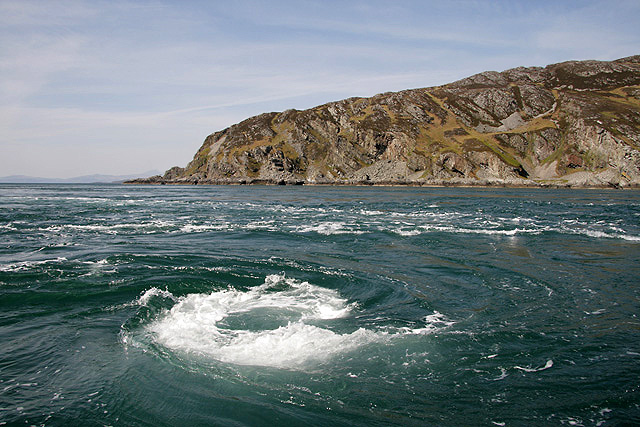
The Corryvreckan Whirlpool.

Like all inhabited Hebridean islands, Jura has its own indigenous tradition of Gaelic song and poetry. Since 1993 it has also been the home of the Jura Music Festival, which takes place annually in September.

Jura is featured in the plot of the 2003 novel A Question of Blood by Ian Rankin, and the 2007 novel The Careful Use of Compliments by the Scottish writer Alexander McCall Smith, and is a setting for some of the narrative and action in Anne Michaels' 2008 novel The Winter Vault. The island is the setting for the novel Burning Down George Orwell's House, by Andrew Ervin. In music, Jura is the subject of the first two movements ('Summer Sea' and 'The Paps of Jura') of the Hebridean Suite (1947) for cello and piano by Scottish composer Marie Dare. Jura is mentioned in a song by R. Kennedy and D. MacDonald, recorded in 1997 by JCB with Jerry Holland on the album A Trip to Cape Breton; "The Bens of Jura", a song by Capercaillie; and "Isle of Jura", a song by Skyclad. The UK band Mekons recorded an album on the island in 2015 and called it 'Jura'.

The 2010 album Poets and Lighthouses by Tuvan singer Albert Kuvezin of the band Yat Kha was recorded and produced by the British musician Giles Perring on Jura, with some of the performances being recorded in the (now largely felled) forest at Lagg. The album, which featured a photo of the Skervuile Lighthouse in the Sound of Jura as its cover, reached Number 1 in the European World Music Charts in January 2011.

== Jura and The KLF ==
Jura is also known for an event of 23 August 1994, when Bill Drummond and Jimmy Cauty, formerly known as the music group The KLF, filmed themselves burning £1 million in banknotes in the Ardfin boathouse on the south coast of the island.

== Further reading see ==
- Boyle, Patsy (1984) Time in his life: George Orwell, Barnhill, Isle of Jura. P. Boyle. Isle of Arran.
- Lambert, Marc, Editor (2009) Spirit of Jura: Fiction, Essays and Poems from the Jura Lodge. Polygon, Edinburgh. ISBN 978 1 84697 128 0.
- Wilson, Les (2023) Orwell's Island: George, Jura and 1984. Saraband, Salford. ISBN 9781913393779.
- Youngson, Peter (2001) Jura: Island of Deer. Birlinn Ltd. Edinburgh. ISBN 1 84158 136 4.
