= Feolin =

Coordinates: 55.85°N 6.09°W

Feolin: Scottish Gaelic: Faolainn
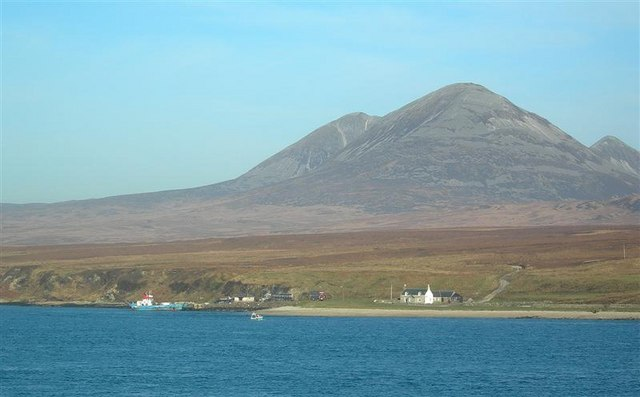
- Feolin Ferry, the view from Port Askaig

- Location within Argyll and Bute
- OS grid reference: NR440692
- Council area: Argyll and Bute
- Lieutenancy area: Argyll and Bute
- Country: Scotland
- Sovereign state: United Kingdom
- Post town: ISLE OF JURA
- Postcode district: PA60
- Dialling code: 01496
- Police: Scotland
- Fire: Scottish
- Ambulance: Scottish
- UK Parliament: Argyll, Bute and South Lochaber
- Scottish Parliament: Argyll and Bute

Feolin (also known as Feolin Ferry) is a slipway on the west coast of Jura. MV Eilean Dhiura provides a vehicle and passenger ferry service from Port Askaig on Islay across the Sound of Islay, the only regular access to the island. The road on both islands has the designation A846.

== History ==
The name "Feolin" means "Field or stony place by the shore".
