= Craighouse =

Coordinates: 55.834°N 5.949°W

Craighouse: Scottish Gaelic: Taigh na Creige
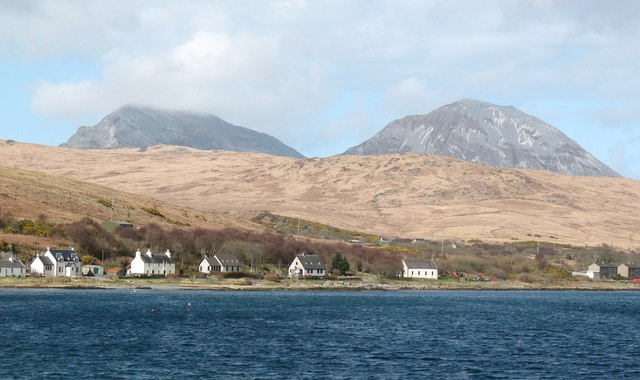
- Craighouse from the pier with the Paps of Jura in the background

- Location within Argyll and Bute
- Population: 113 (1971)
- OS grid reference: NR5267
- Council area: Argyll and Bute
- Lieutenancy area: Argyll and Bute
- Country: Scotland
- Sovereign state: United Kingdom
- Post town: ISLE OF JURA
- Postcode district: PA60
- Dialling code: 01496
- Police: Scotland
- Fire: Scottish
- Ambulance: Scottish
- UK Parliament: Argyll, Bute and South Lochaber
- Scottish Parliament: Argyll and Bute

Craighouse (Scottish Gaelic: Taigh na Creige) is the main settlement and capital of the Scottish Inner Hebridean island of Jura, in Argyll and Bute. In 1971 it had a population of 113. The village is situated on the sheltered east coast of the island at the southern end of Small Isles Bay, on the Sound of Jura.

Since 2007, a passenger-only ferry service between Craighouse and Tayvallich on the Scottish mainland has operated during the summer months. This service was resurrected by the community after several decades without a direct mainland ferry.

Vehicular access to the island now via a small ferry between Feolin on Jura, 8 miles (13 kilometres) south of Craighouse via road) and Port Askaig on neighbouring Islay.

== Facilities in Craighouse ==
Today Craighouse is the social centre of the island and is home to:

- Jura Community Shop, (Post Office, provisions, general goods)
- The Jura Hotel
- The Antlers Cafe
- Community run diesel and petrol pumps
- Whisky Island Gallery (photography)
- Deer Island Distillery, producing Jura's only rum
- Camella Crafts (local crafts)
- Jura Distillery, producer of Isle of Jura Single Malt Whisky
- Jura Service Point (archives, oral history recordings, photocopying, printing, meeting rooms)
- Small Isles Primary School
- Jura Parish Church
- The Village hall

== History ==
The name "Craighouse" means "The house by the rock".
