= PAP =

PAP or Pap may refer to:

== Places ==
- Ancient Pap, an archaeological site in Uzbekistan
- Pap, Hungary, a village in northeastern Hungary
- Paps of Anu, near Killarney, Ireland
- Paps of Fife in Scotland
- Paps of Jura, on the western side of the island of Jura, in the Inner Hebrides, Scotland
- Paps of Lothian (disambiguation), in Scotland
- Pap or Maiden Paps (disambiguation), rounded breast-shaped hills located mostly in Scotland
- Pap of Glencoe in the Scottish Highlands
- Pap, Uzbekistan, a town and the administrative center of Pap District
  - Pap District, Uzbekistan

== People ==
- Pap (surname)
- Pap (given name)
- Pap (nickname)

== Biology and medicine ==
- Nipple or teat
- Pap test or Pap smear, a method for detecting abnormalities in the cells of a woman's cervix
- Phosphatidic acid phosphatase, a key regulatory enzyme in lipid metabolism
- Plasmin-α_{2}-antiplasmin complex, an inactive complex of plasmin and antiplasmin
- Polyadenylate polymerase, an enzyme involved in creation of mRNA tails
- Positive airway pressure, a method of respiratory ventilation used in the treatment of sleep apnea
- Prostatic acid phosphatase, an enzyme produced by the prostate
- Pulmonary alveolar proteinosis, a rare lung disorder

== Chemistry ==
- Phenthoate or PAP, an insecticide poisonous to humans
- Purple acid phosphatases, metalloenzymes that hydrolyse phosphate esters and anhydrides
- Phthalimidoperoxycaproic acid, a bleaching agent

== Organizations ==
- Palestinian Air Police, air force of Palestine
- Pan-African Parliament, a legislative body of the African Union
- People's Action Party, the conservative political party that governs Singapore
- Other political parties that may be known as "People's Action Party"
- People's Alternative Party, a political party in Malaysia
- People's Armed Police, a paramilitary police force in China
- Polish Press Agency (Polska Agencja Prasowa), a news agency in Poland
- Power to the People (Italy), a coalition of political parties in Italy

== Technology ==
- Password Authentication Protocol
- Permissible Actions Protocol in cybersecurity
- Policy Administration Point, in the XACML markup language
- Printer Access Protocol, a network protocol for talking to printers in an AppleTalk network
- Push Access Protocol, part of the Wireless Application Protocol suite

=== Firearms ===
- PAP M59, nicknamed Papovka, Yugoslav variants of Soviet SKS semi-automatic military rifles
- Zastava PAP series, Poluautomatska puška (semi-automatic rifle/pistol), Serbian sporting weapons

== Other ==
- pap, Papiamento or Papiamentu ISO 639-2 and 639-3 language code
- Pap, a Dutch word for porridge
  - Pap, a colloquial term for some types of baby food, particularly those homemade from soft bread
  - Pap or mieliepap (Afrikaans for maize porridge), a traditional porridge/polenta and staple food in South Africa
- Pap or Bilz y Pap, a brand name of soft drinks in Chile
- PAP, a code for paper in recycling codes 20, 21, and 22
- PAP, IATA code for Toussaint L'Ouverture International Airport in Port-au-Prince, Haiti
- Perth–Augusta–Perth, a cycling event in Western Australia
- PAP-k, k primes in arithmetic progression in mathematics
- Post-activation potentiation, a physiological response utilized in sports training and especially in Complex training
- Pre-authorized payment, a term sometimes used for Direct debit
- An internet slang for Post a Picture
- Paap, a 2003 Indian Hindi-language film
- Paap (TV series), an Indian Bengali-language web series
