= Paps =

Paps may refer to:

== Geography ==
- Breast-shaped hill, commonly named paps
  - Paps of Anu
  - Paps of Fife
  - Paps of Jura
  - Paps of Lothian (disambiguation)
  - Maiden Paps (disambiguation)

== Other uses ==
- Paparazzi, a kind of photojournalist
- Papilloma, a wart
- PAPS, 3'-phosphoadenosine-5'-phosphosulfate
- Emanuele Cozzi, an Italian dance musician of Paps 'n' Skar

== See also ==
- Pap of Glencoe
- PAP (disambiguation)
