= Mamelon =

Mamelon (from French mamelon, "nipple") may refer to

- Mamelon (dentistry), a protrusion on a newly erupted tooth
- Mamelon (fort), a hillock fortified by the Russians and captured by the French during the Siege of Sevastopol (1854–1855)
- Mamelon (Sikasso), a hill in Sikasso, Mali
- Mamelon (sponge anatomy), raised bumps on the surface of certain sea sponges, such as the extinct Stromatoporoidea
- Mamelon (volcanology), a hill formed by eruption of "stiff" lava
