= Shankend railway station =

Disused railway station in Shankend, Scottish Borders

Shankend
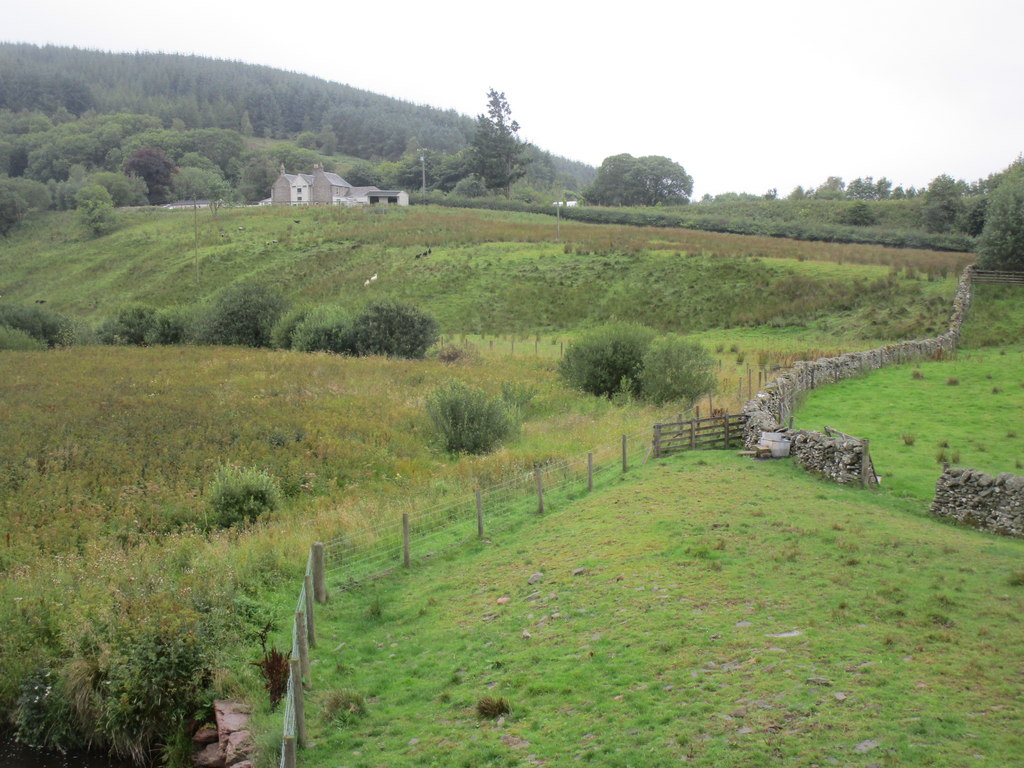
- The site of the station in 2018

General information
- Location: Shankend, Scottish Borders; Scotland
- Coordinates: 55.3431°N 2.752°W
- Grid reference: NT524057
- Platforms: 2

Other information
- Status: Disused

History
- Original company: Border Union Railway
- Pre-grouping: North British Railway
- Post-grouping: LNER; British Rail (Scottish Region)

Key dates
- 1 July 1862: Opened
- 6 January 1969: Closed
Location

Shankend railway station served the hamlet of Shankend, Scottish Borders, Scotland from 1862 to 1969 on the Border Union Railway.

== History ==
The station opened on 1 July 1862 by the Border Union Railway. The station was situated at the end of a drive off an access road to Shankend Farm and west of the B6399. The goods yard consisted of three loop sidings, one serving a cattle dock. A locomotive was often kept in the goods yard for banking on the climb up to Whitrope. The station was downgraded to an unstaffed halt on 3 July 1961, although the suffix 'halt' never appeared in the timetables. The station closed to goods traffic on 28 December 1964 remained open for passengers until 6 January 1969.

Preceding station	Disused railways	Following station
Stobs; Line and station closed	North British Railway; Border Union Railway	Riccarton Junction; Line and station closed
