= Breast-shaped hill =

Hills shaped like a human breast

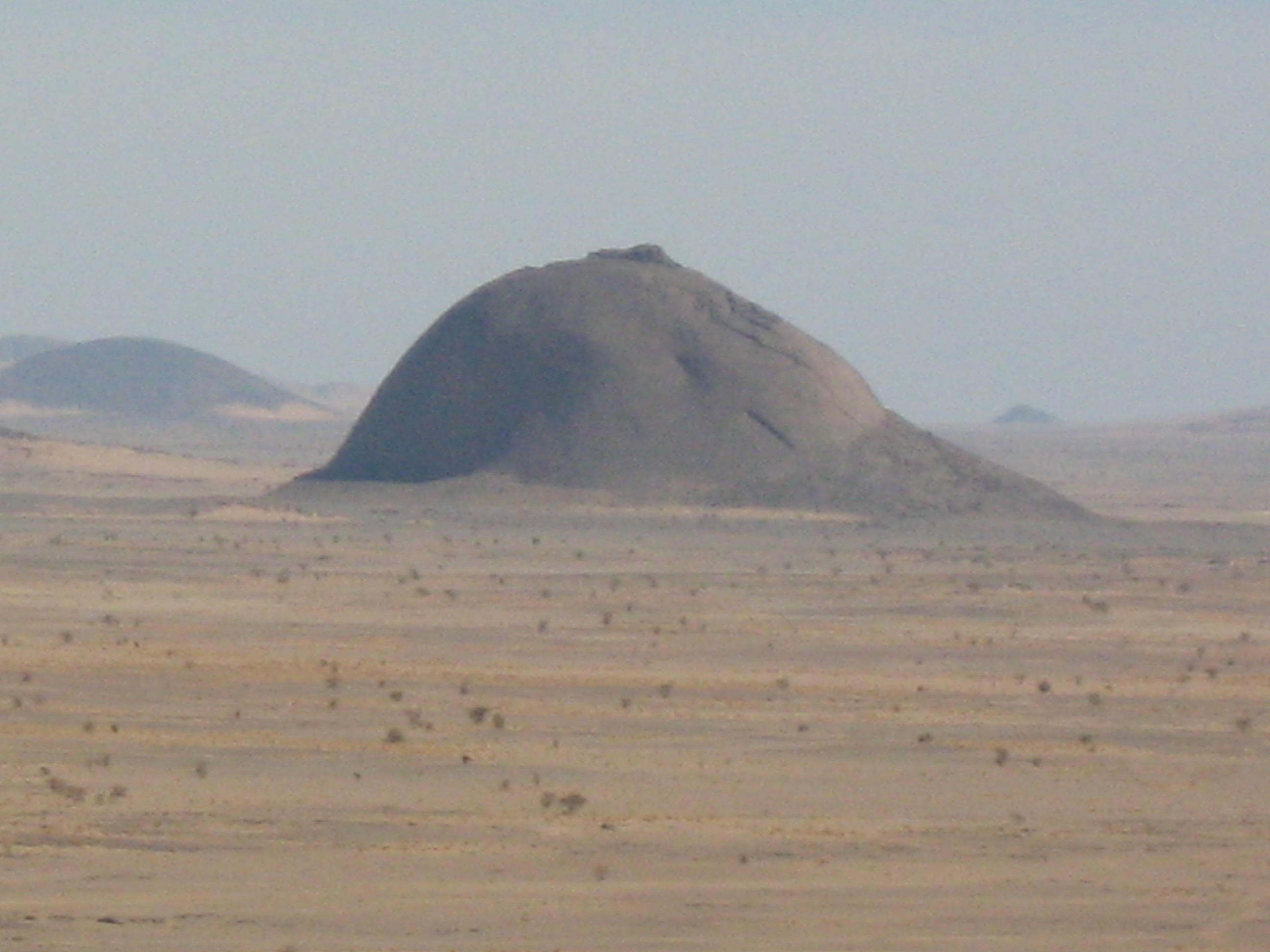
A breast-shaped hill in Western Sahara

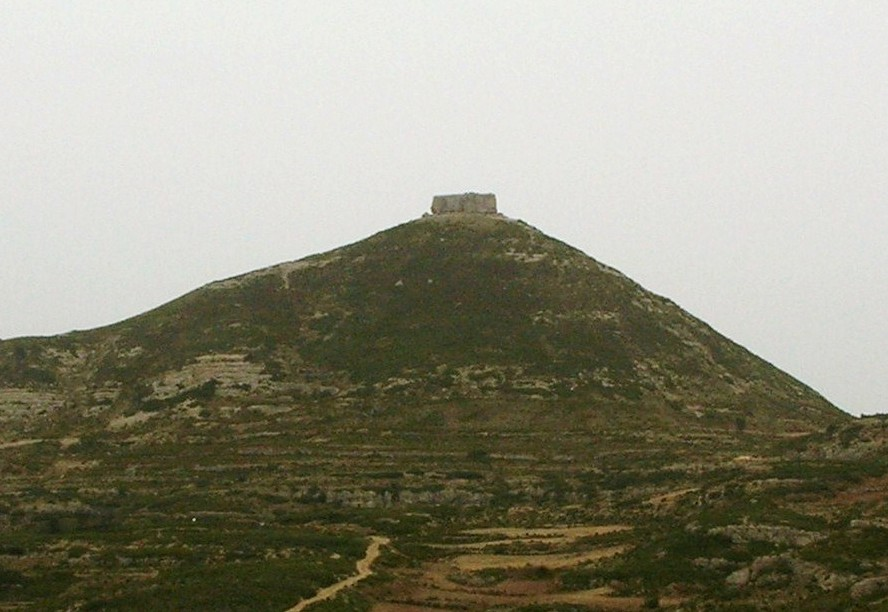
There is an ancient Iberian archaeological site beneath the Mola Murada, a breast-shaped hill in the Moles de Xert, Spain.

Breast-shaped hills are anthropomorphic geographic features found in various parts of the world. In some traditional cultures they were once revered as the attributes of the Mother Goddess, such as the Paps of Anu, named after Anu, an important female deity of pre-Christian Ireland. "Pap" is an archaic word for the breast or nipple of a woman. It is used in the name of a number of breast-shaped hills, particularly those with a small hilltop protuberance.

== Overview ==
The Mamelon Central, formed by the Bory and Dolomieu craters, Piton de la Fournaise, on 28 brumaire 1801. Drawing by Jean-Baptiste Bory de Saint-Vincent.

The name Mamucium that gave origin to the name of the city of Manchester is thought to derive from a Celtic language name meaning "breast-shaped hill", referring to the sandstone bluff on which the fort stood; this later evolved into the name Manchester.

Mamelon (from French "nipple") is a French name for a breast-shaped hillock. Fort Mamelon was a famous hillock fortified by the Russians and captured by the French as part of the Siege of Sevastopol (1854–1855) during the Crimean War of the 1850s. The word mamelon is also used in volcanology to describe a particular rock formation of volcanic origin. The term was coined by the French explorer and naturalist Jean Baptiste Bory de Saint-Vincent.

== Africa ==
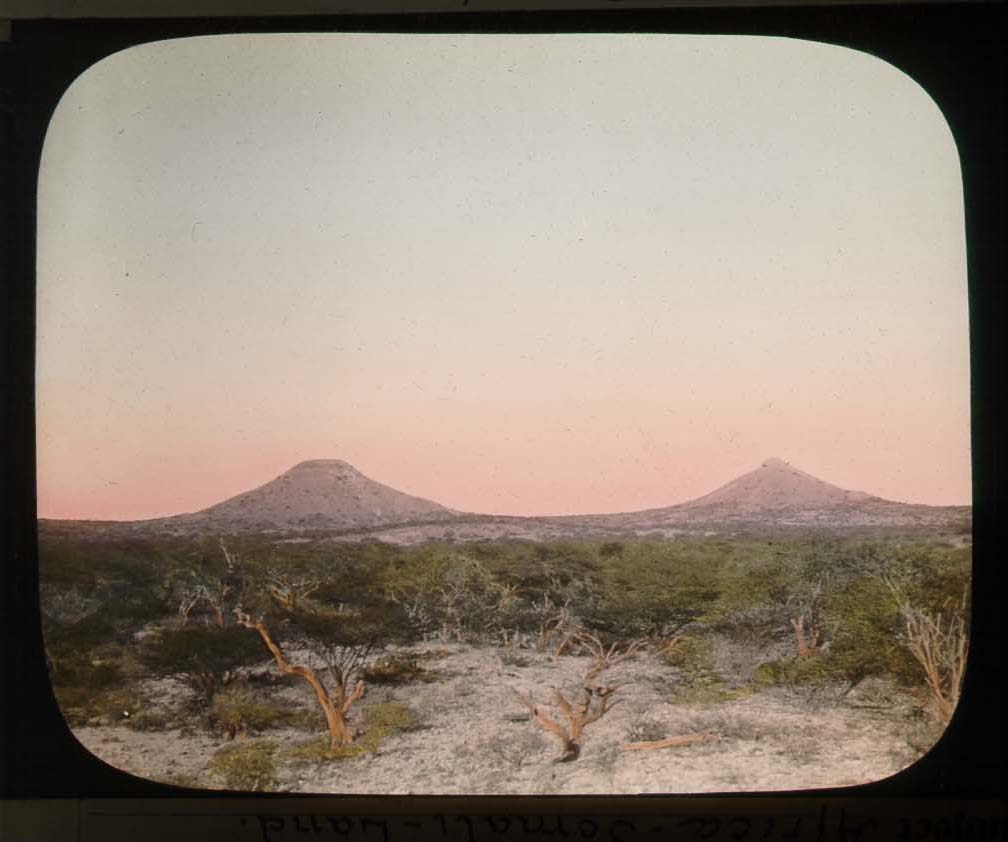
The thelarchic-shaped Naasa Hablood in Somaliland (1896)

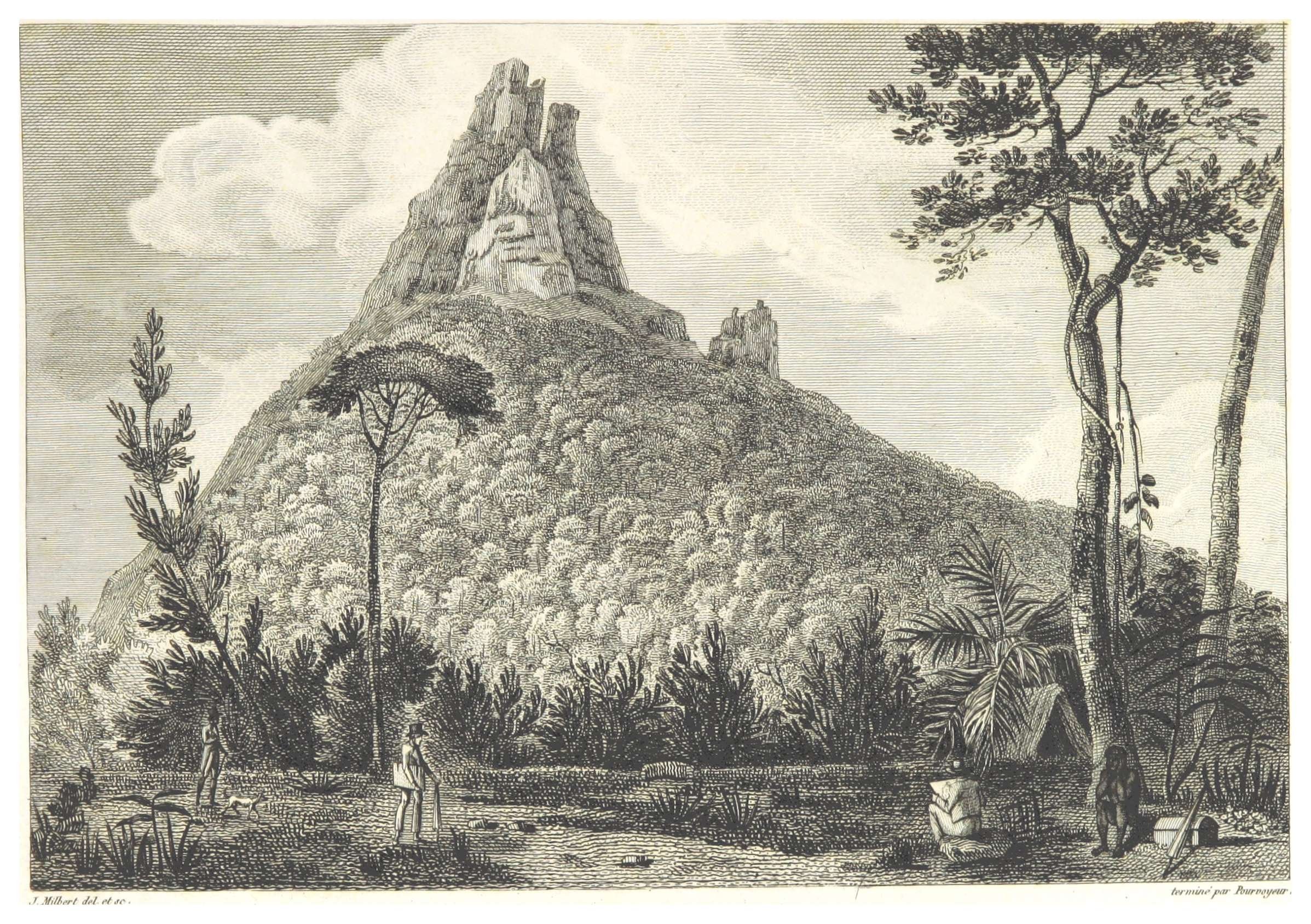
View of one of the Trois Mamelles in Mauritius. Drawing from page 121 of Atlas by Jacques-Gérard Milbert.

=== African Great Lakes ===
- Mount Elgon on the Uganda-Kenya border.
- Sweet Sixteen, Matthews Range (Ldoinyo Lenkiyio), Laikipia district, Rift Valley Province, northern Kenya.

=== Horn of Africa ===
- Naasa Hablood in Somaliland.

=== Indian Ocean ===
- Trois Mamelles mountains in the west of Mauritius
- Mamelles Island, Seychelles

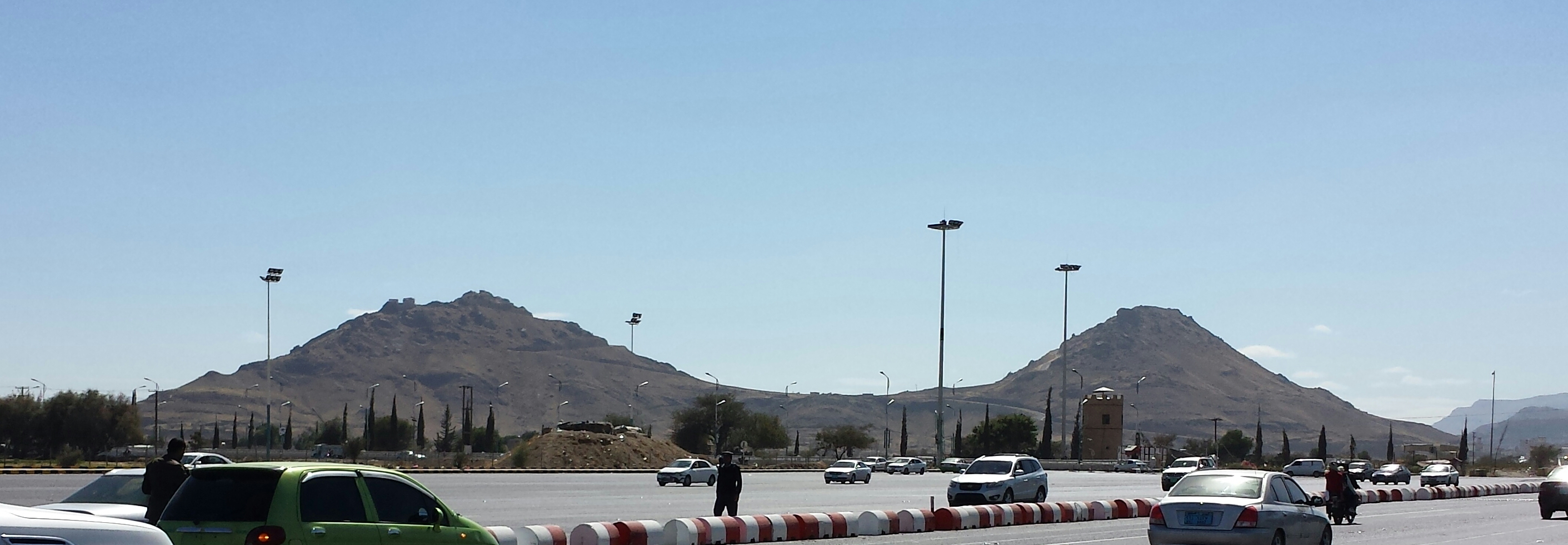
Jabal al-Nahdain in Sana’a, Yemen

=== North Africa ===
- Jebel Toubkal in the Atlas Mountains in Morocco.

=== Southern Africa ===
- Sheba's Breasts, Eswatini; these formations inspired British writer H. Rider Haggard, who included them in his novel King Solomon's Mines.

=== West Africa ===
- Breast Mountain in Kyabobo National Park, Ghana.
- Deux Mamelles, Pointe des Almadies, Cap-Vert, Senegal

== Antarctica ==
- Una Peaks, long known as Una's Tits colloquially, at the entrance to the Lemaire Channel, Graham Land
- Nipple Peak, Palmer Archipelago, Graham Land

== Asia ==
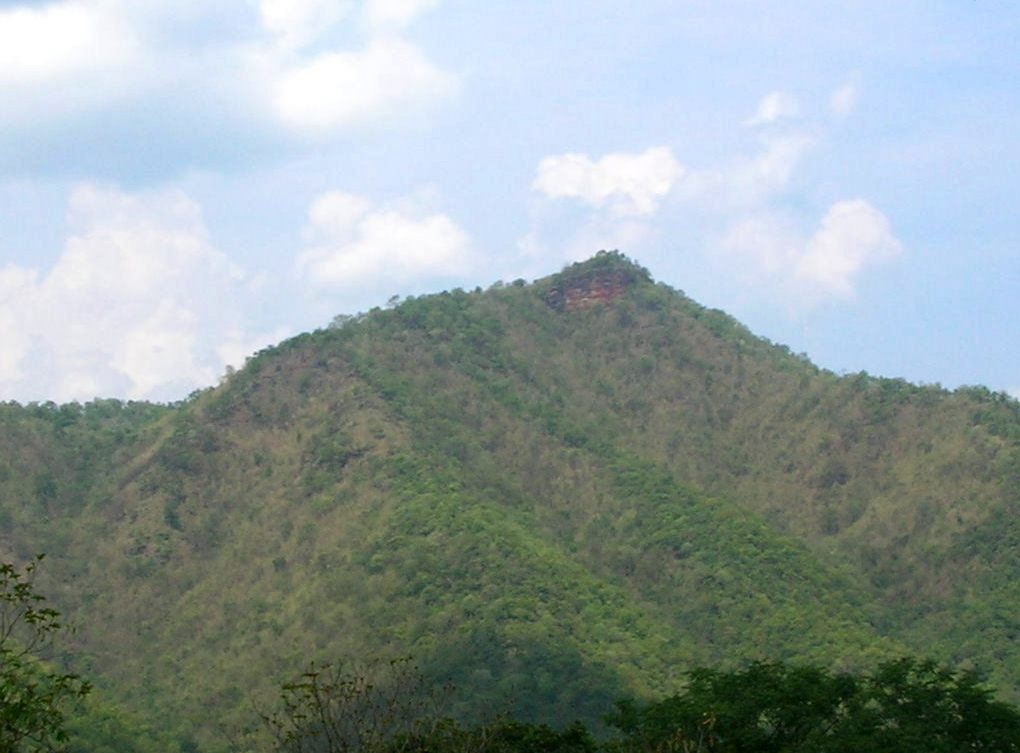
Khao Nom Nang in Western Thailand

=== Cambodia ===
- Sroh-Plom Mountain, "Virtuous Woman's Breast Mountain", located close to Senmonorom, Senmonorom District, Mondulkiri Province, Cambodia.

=== China ===
- Dazeshan Mountain in Shandong Province
- Wuyi Mountain in Fujian Province
- Twin Breasts Peak in Tianzhu Mountain in Anhui Province
- Qianling Mausoleum near Xian, their shape is man-made
- Two Breast Peaks (Chinese: 雙乳峰):

- two mountains in Zhenfeng County, Guizhou Province

- Rushan (meaning "Breast Mountain") is a mountain in Weihai, Shandong Province.

=== Japan ===
- Mount Tsukuba with double peaks, one considered male (Nantai-san) and one female (Nyotai-san).

=== Malaysia ===
- Hills on Dayang Bunting Island, Langkawi, named for their resemblance to a pregnant maiden.

=== Middle East ===
- Tell Sader al-Arus (translation from Arabic: "Breast of the bride") is a mountain in the Golan Heights.

=== Philippines ===
- Ilihan Hill, "Watery Breast", a pilgrimage site about four kilometres from Jagna, Bohol
- Kagmasuso, among other breast-shaped hills in San Andres, Catanduanes
- Mount Susong Dalaga (literally "Maiden's Breasts Mountain") is the name of several peaks in the Philippines, including:

- Mount Susong Dalaga, Abra de Ilog, Occidental Mindoro
- Mount Susong Dalaga (also known as Breast Peak) in Tampakan, South Cotabato
- Susong Dalaga Peak of Mount Batolusong, Tanay, Rizal
- Manabu Peak (also known as Mount Dalaga or Mount Susong Dalaga) of the Malepunyo Mountain Range between the provinces of Batangas, Laguna, and Quezon
- Mount Tagapo (also known as Mount Susong Dalaga), Talim Island, Rizal two huge conical hills that are the highest peaks of Talim Island.

=== Russia ===
- Mount Umai in the Siberian Republic of Khakassia, resembling a human breast, is named after the mother goddess Umai.

=== Taiwan ===
- Twin peaks of Golden Needle Mountain (Chinese: 雙乳峰) in Taimali Township, Taitung County. The name given to the twin peaks is the Chinese: 双乳, romanized: Shuangru, lit. 'twin breasts'.

=== Thailand ===
- Doi Phu Nom (Thai: ดอยภูนม), Phayao Province, a breast-shaped hill rising in an area of grassland of the Phi Pan Nam Range.
- Khao Nom (Thai: เขานม), was one of the former names of Khanom, a district of Nakhon Si Thammarat Province, due to the surrounding mountains.
- Khao Nom Nang, a hill at Huai Krachao, Kanchanaburi. 14°18′00″N 99°43′00″E
- Khao Nom Nang, (Thai: เขานมนาง), a hill north of Pak Phraek, Kanchanaburi. 14°05′00″N 99°34′00″E
- Khao Nom Nang, a hill between Nong Pet and Chong Sadao, Kanchanaburi. 14°21′02″N 99°12′53″E
- Khao Nom Nang, an isolated hill in Khok Samae San, Lopburi. 15°19′00″N 100°51′00″E
- Khao Nom Nang, an isolated large hill in Khao Kala, Nakhon Sawan Province. 15°34′00″N 100°17′00″E
- Khao Nom Nang, the name of two hills west of Doeng Bang Nam Buat, Suphan Buri. 14°51′00″N 100°04′00″E
- Khao Nom Sao (Thai: เขานมสาว, lit. 'female breast mountain'), a mountain located in Ranong Province, Thailand.
- Khao Nom Sao, a round hill east of Phet Kasem road in Prachuap Khiri Khan Province. 10°59′00″N 99°22′00″E
- Khao Nom Sao, a mountain in Chumphon Province. 09°46′00″N 98°43′01″E
- Khao Nom Sao, a hill in Phang Nga Province, part of a greater mountain system. 08°58′00″N 98°28′00″E
- Khao Nom Wang (Thai: เขานมวังก), a small hill just east of the main road at Phanom Wang, Khuan Khanun District, also known as Khao Phanom Wang, Phatthalung Province. 07°40′58″N 100°01′01″E
- Ko Nom Sao (Thai: เกาะนมสาว, lit. 'female breast island') are twin islands located in the Phang Nga Bay, Phang Nga Province.
- Ko Nom Sao in Khao Sam Roi Yot National Park, Prachuap Khiri Khan Province. 12°13′N 100°01′E
- Ko Nom Sao, an island off the shore in Chanthaburi Province. 12°28′N 102°01′E

== Europe ==
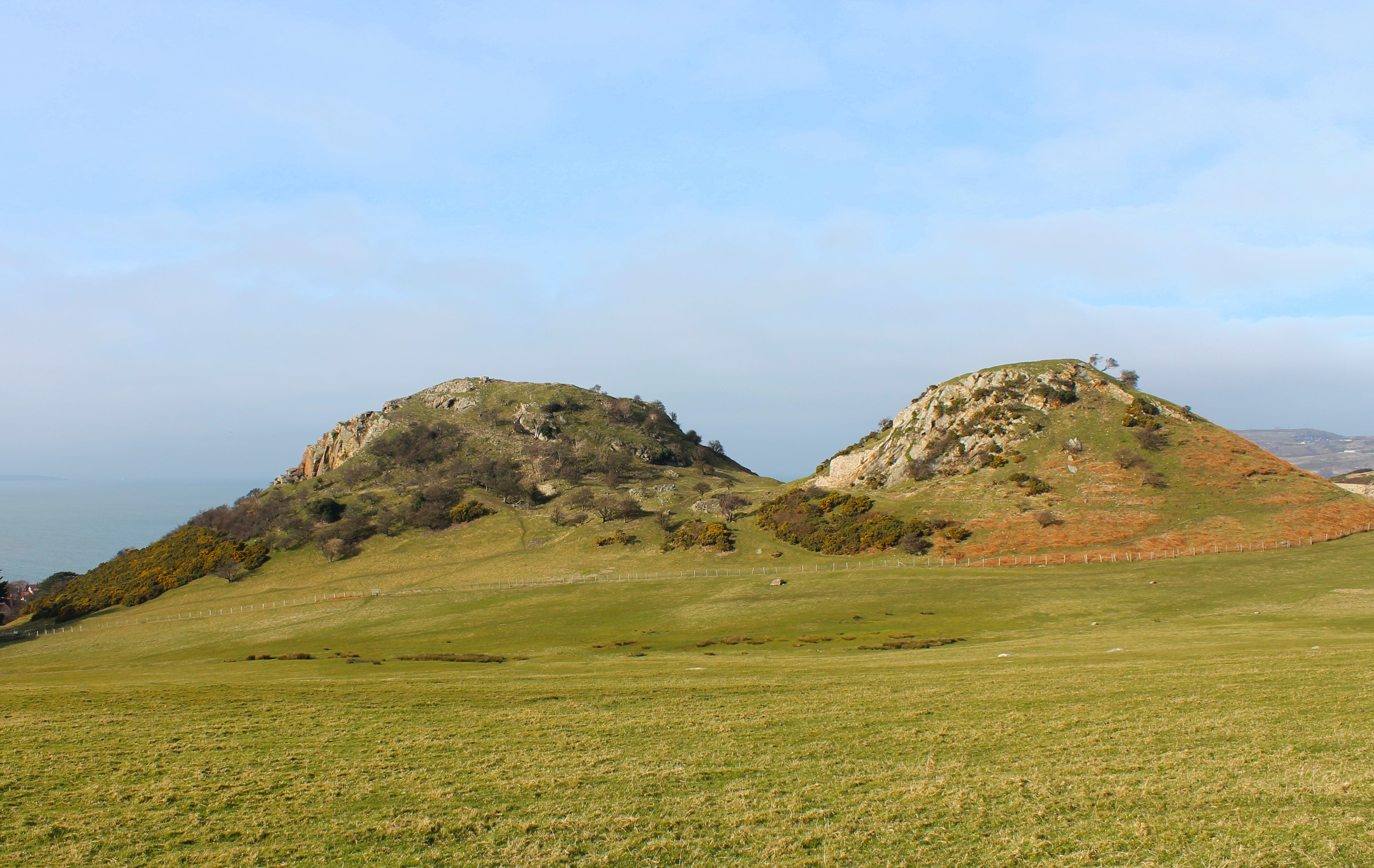
Deganwy Castle

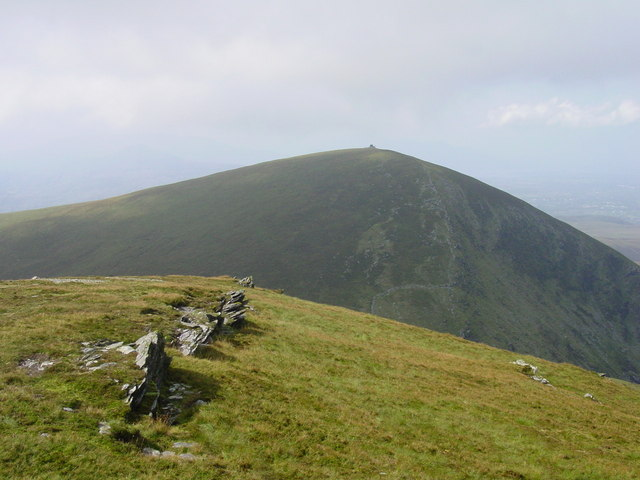
Paps of Anu. View of the western Pap from the eastern Pap, Ireland.

=== UK and Ireland ===
- Mumbles, the two islands (on one of which stands a lighthouse) off the southeast corner of the Gower peninsula, Swansea, Wales
- Beinn Chìochan in the Grampians, Scotland
- Bennachie in Aberdeenshire, Scotland
- Mam Barisdale in Knoydart, Scotland
- Mynydd Llanwenarth near Abergavenny, Wales
- Mount Keen in Aberdeenshire / Angus, Scotland
- Northala Fields in London, England. Technically 4 hills, and artificial, but clearly resembling two "grassy boobs" from the A40
- A' Chioch in Ben More, Isle of Mull, Scotland
- Mam Sodhail, on the northern side of Glen Affric, some 30 kilometres east of Kyle of Lochalsh
- Mam Tor, near Castleton in the High Peak of Derbyshire, England.
- Samson, Isles of Scilly
- Twmbarlwm near Risca, Wales
- Wittenham Clumps in Oxfordshire
- Shutlingsloe, Cheshire
- Paps or Maiden Paps are rounded, breastlike hills located mostly in Scotland:
  - Paps of Anu, near Killarney, Ireland
  - Paps of Fife in Scotland
  - Paps of Jura, on the western side of the island of Jura, in the Inner Hebrides, Scotland
  - Paps of Lothian in Scotland
  - Maiden Paps, twin hills in Caithness, Scotland
  - Maiden Paps, twin hills in the Kilpatrick Hills, Scotland
  - Maiden Paps, twin hills south of Hawick in the Scottish Borders, Scotland
  - Maiden Paps, another name for the Tunstall Hills near Sunderland, Tyne and Wear, England
  - Maiden's Pap, another name for Schiehallion, Perth and Kinross, Scotland
  - Pap of Glencoe in the Scottish Highlands

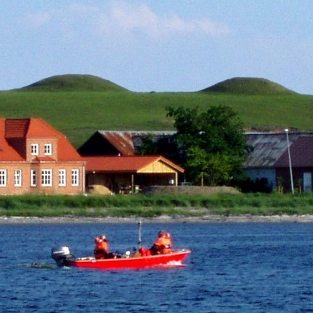
Marens Patter (literally "Maren's Tits") in Denmark

=== Denmark ===
- Marens Patter (Maren's Tits), a pair of twin hills that has functioned as a landmark for seafarers since the Bronze Age.

=== Greece ===
- Aphrodite's Breasts (Greek: divounia) – two hills in Mykonos

=== Slovenia ===
- Šmarna gora or Mount Saint Mary north of Ljubljana.

=== Spain ===
- Burrén and Burrena near Fréscano, Aragon
- Mola Murada near Valencia.
- Picos de Busampiro, commonly known as Tetas de Lierganes, in Cantabria
- Puig de Mamelles, Felanitx, Mallorca
- Ses Mamelles, another name for the 714 m (2343 ft) high Puig des Castellot, Escorca, Mallorca
- Tetas de Viana, La Alcarria, Guadalajara Province
- Tetica de Bacares or "La Tetica", a 2,086 m (6,488 ft) high mountain in the Sierra de Los Filabres, Spain.
- Turó de la Mamella, a mountain near Vacarisses, Catalonia

=== France ===
- Téton de Vénus in the Mounts of Cantal

== North and Central America ==
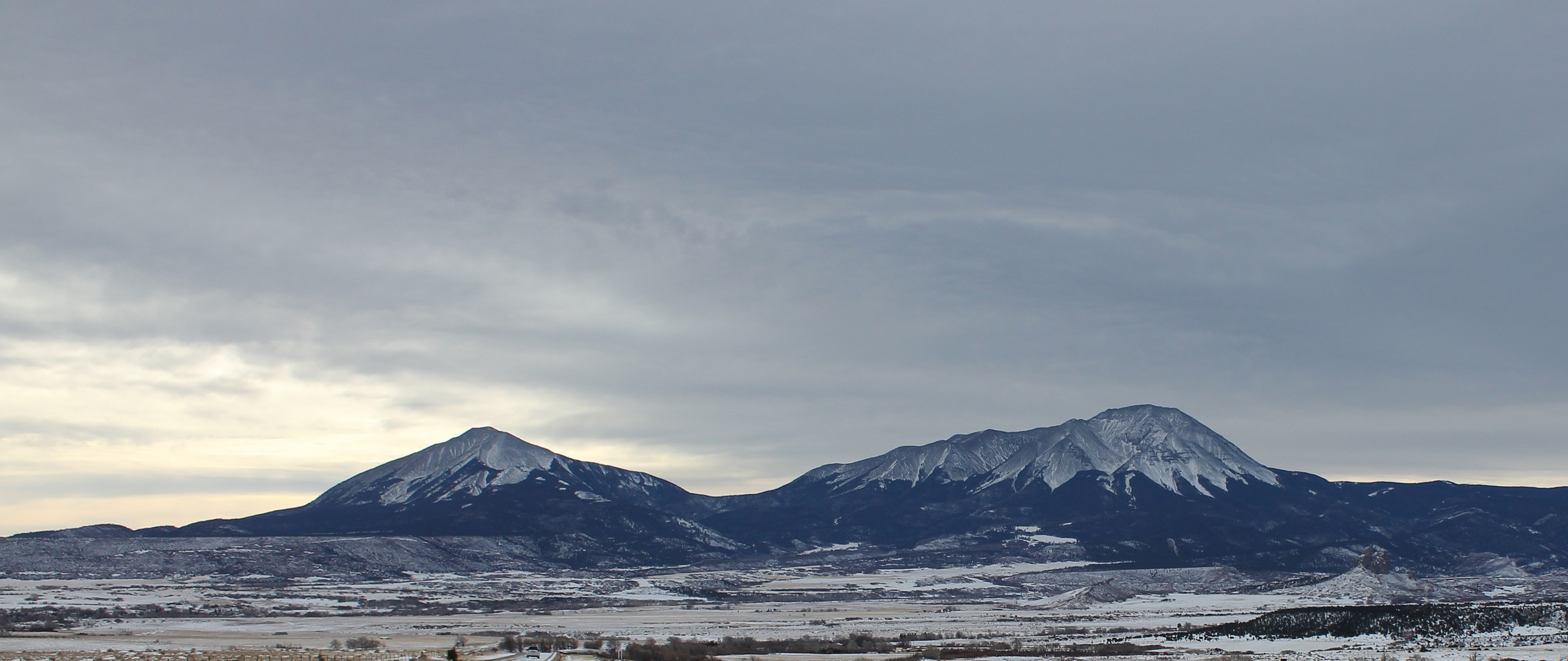
Spanish Peaks, Colorado

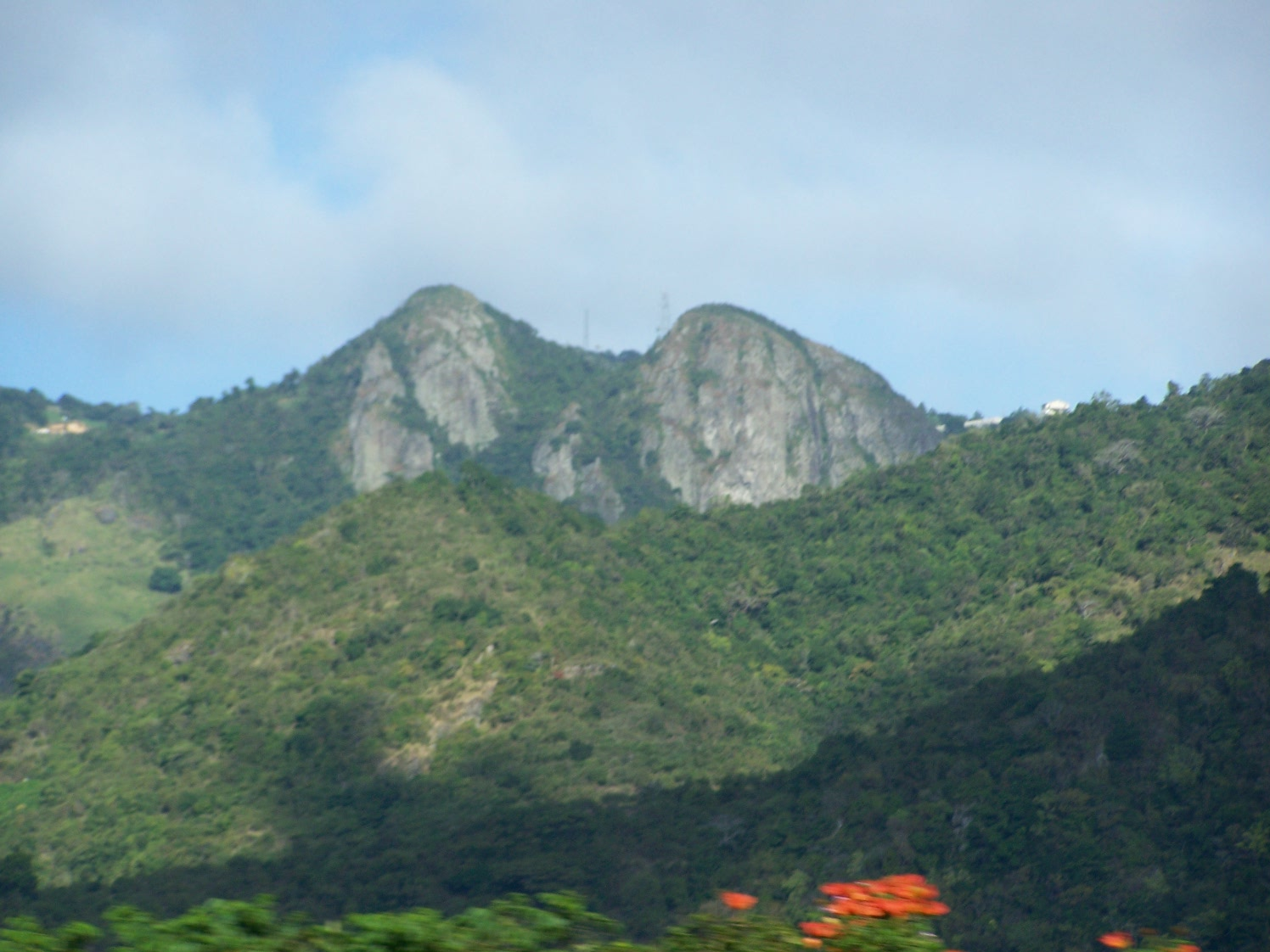
Las Tetas de Cayey in Salinas, Puerto Rico

=== Canada ===
- Anûkathâ Îpa in the Canadian Rockies of Alberta

=== El Salvador ===
- San Vicente, also known as Chichontepec, the mountain of the two breasts in Nahuat, a stratovolcano

=== Guadeloupe ===
- Les Deux Mamelles, 'The Two Breasts', twin peaks on Guadeloupe.

=== Haiti ===
- Morne Deux Mamelles, in the Deux Mamelles National Park, Haiti.

=== Mexico ===
- Las Tetas de Juana, San Pedro Municipality, Coahuila
- Tres Tetas Mountain or El Chichión in Costa Grande of Guerrero

=== Nicaragua ===
- Ometepe, in Lake Nicaragua. Legend says that the island's volcanoes Maderas and Concepción formed from the breasts of Ometepetl, a daughter of the Niquirano tribe.

=== Panama ===
- Cerro La Teta in Las Guabas

=== Puerto Rico ===
- Cerro Las Tetas in Salinas
- Tetas de Cerro Gordo in San German

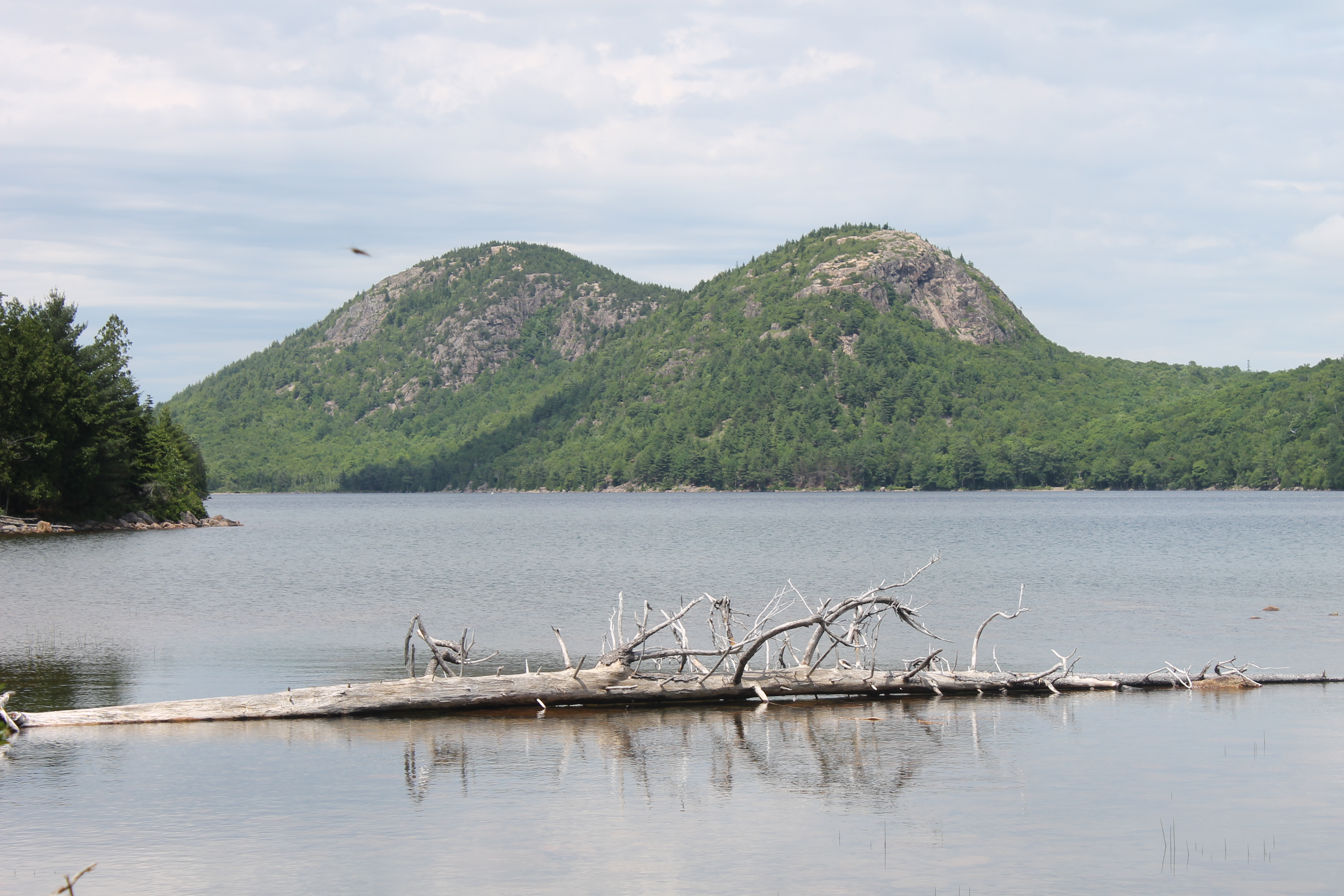
The Bubbles on Jordan Pond in Acadia National Park

=== United States ===
- Bubble Mountains, in Acadia National Park, Maine.
- Isanaklesh Peaks, in Maricopa County, Arizona, formerly known as Squaw Tits.
- Nippletop, in the Adirondack High Peaks of New York. During the later 19th century, it was euphemistically renamed "Dial Mountain", a name now officially applied to another nearby peak.
- Pilot Mountain, North Carolina. Referenced many times on The Andy Griffith Show as Mt. Pilot. Andy spoke about a wonderful place to travel called "Pilot" by the locals.
- Pinnacle Mountain, Arkansas, near Maumelle. During the colonial and early American periods, the mountain was known as "Mamelle" mountain. "Mamelle" is a name commonly applied in the French-speaking parts of the world to a breast.
- Rock Mary, Caddo County, Oklahoma.
- Spanish Peaks, Colorado, named Huajatolla by the Ute Indians, meaning "two breasts".
- Tetilla Peak, Caja del Rio, New Mexico. Tetilla is Spanish for "nipple".
- Tatoosh Peak and Tatoosh Range, near Mount Rainier in Washington State. From the Chinook Jargon word for "breast".
- Teton Range. French-Canadian trappers named the Teton Mountains around 1820. The distinctive peaks appeared as Les Trois Tétons (The Three Breasts) as seen from the north;
  - Grand Teton,
  - Middle Teton,
  - South Teton.
- Twin Peaks, in San Francisco, California. When the Spanish conquistadors and settlers arrived at the beginning of the 18th century, they called the area "Los Pechos de la Chola" or "Breasts of the Indian Maiden" and devoted the area to ranching. When San Francisco passed under American control during the 19th century, it was renamed "Twin Peaks".
- Maggie's Peaks, just west of Lake Tahoe, California.
- Uncanoonuc Mountains, Goffstown, New Hampshire. From a Native American word for a woman's breasts.
- Mollie's Nipple or Molly's Nipple is the name given to as many as seven peaks and some other geological features in Utah.
- Tunas Peak located in Pecos County, Texas, west of Bakersfield.
- Betsy Bell and Mary Gray, two adjacent hills in Staunton, Virginia.
- Little and Big House Mountain, two adjacent mountains in Lexington, Virginia, resemble breasts if viewed from Kerr's Creek.

== Oceania ==
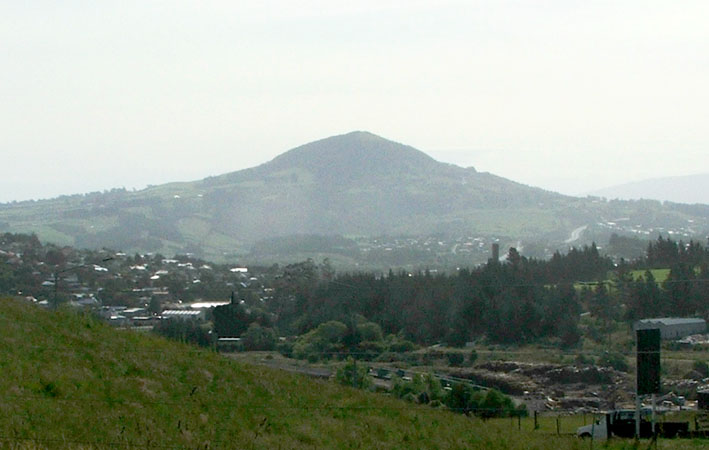
Saddle Hill, as seen from Lookout Point, Dunedin, New Zealand

=== Australia ===
- Pyramid Hill, Pilbara, Western Australia
- The Paps, Victoria
- Pigeon House Mountain, New South Wales
- Black Mountain (Australian Capital Territory) and Mount Ainslie, the space between being known as Canberra, meaning cleavage between the two 'breasts' of those mountains.
- Mammaloid Hills, Victoria, Australia

=== New Zealand ===
- Saddle Hill, Dunedin

== South America ==
=== Argentina ===
- Cerro Tres Tetas, in Santa Cruz
- Cerro Teta in Neuquén.
- Ñuñorco Grande, in Tucumán.
- Los Nonos, in Nono, Córdoba.

=== Bolivia ===
- Cerro Tres Tetas in Potosí

=== Chile ===
- Sierra Teta, Futaleufú
- Tetas del Biobío, formed by Cerro Teta Norte and Cerro Teta Sur, located in the mouth of the Biobío River.

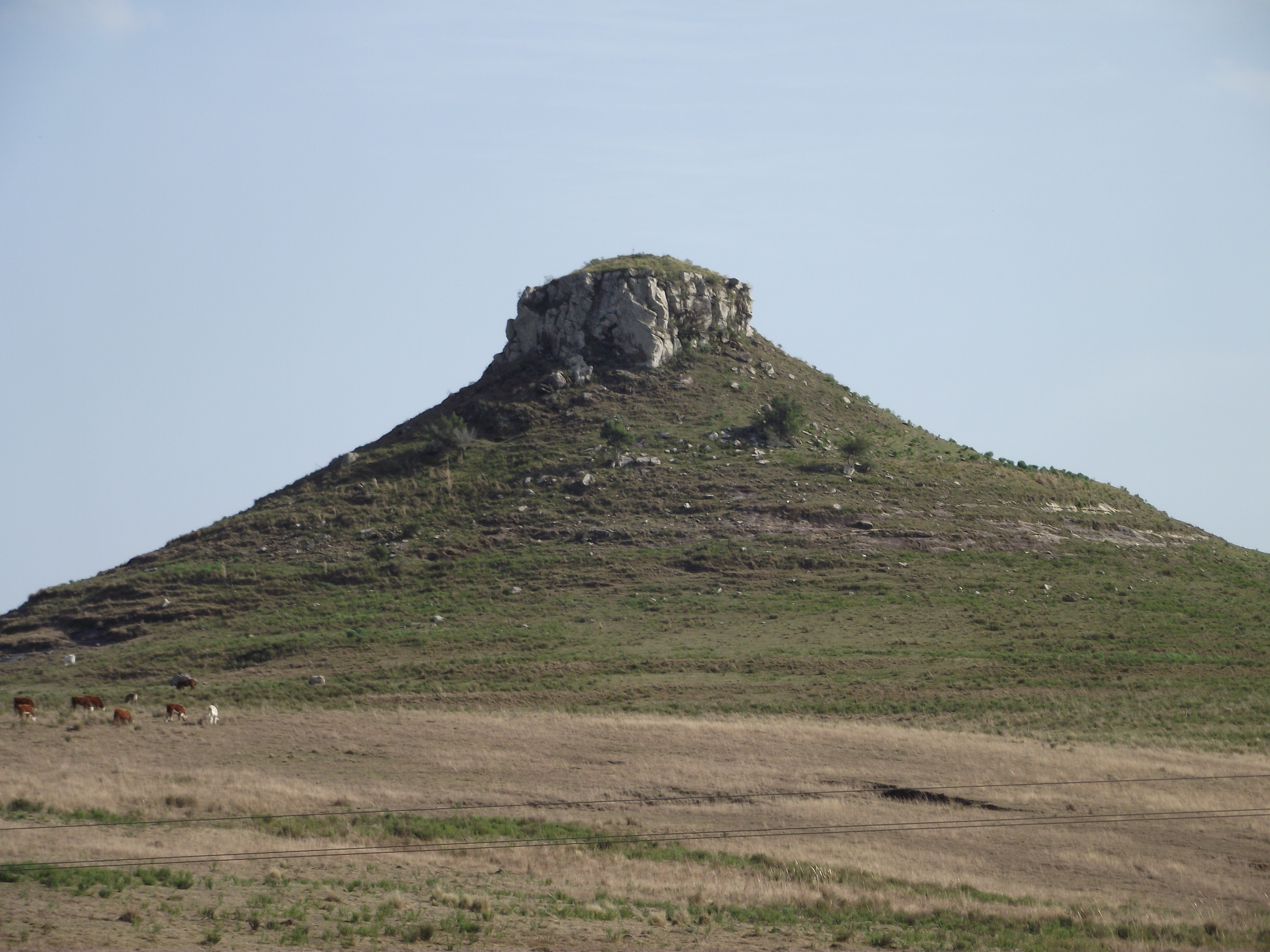
Cerro Batoví, Tacuarembó, Uruguay

=== Colombia ===
- Cerro La Teta, La Guajira
- La Sedona in the Tayrona National Park, Colombia.
- Morro La Teta, El Carmen de Viboral, Antioquia
- Pico Tetari, Serranía del Perijá, La Guajira

=== Cuba ===
- Tetas de Santa Teresa, Baracoa

=== French Guiana ===
- Les Mamelles Islets

=== Peru ===
- Cerro Tetas, Chiclayo Province

=== Uruguay ===
- Cerro Batoví, in Tacuarembó. Batoví means breast of a virgin in the Guarani language.

=== Venezuela ===
- Tetas de María Guevara, Isla Margarita
- Teta de Niquitao, Trujillo State
- Cerro de Las Tetas, Tinaquillo, Cojedes
- Cerro las Tres Tetas, Barquisimeto

== Gallery ==
Seal of La Colle-Saint-Michel former commune with two golden breast-shaped hills (Mamelons)

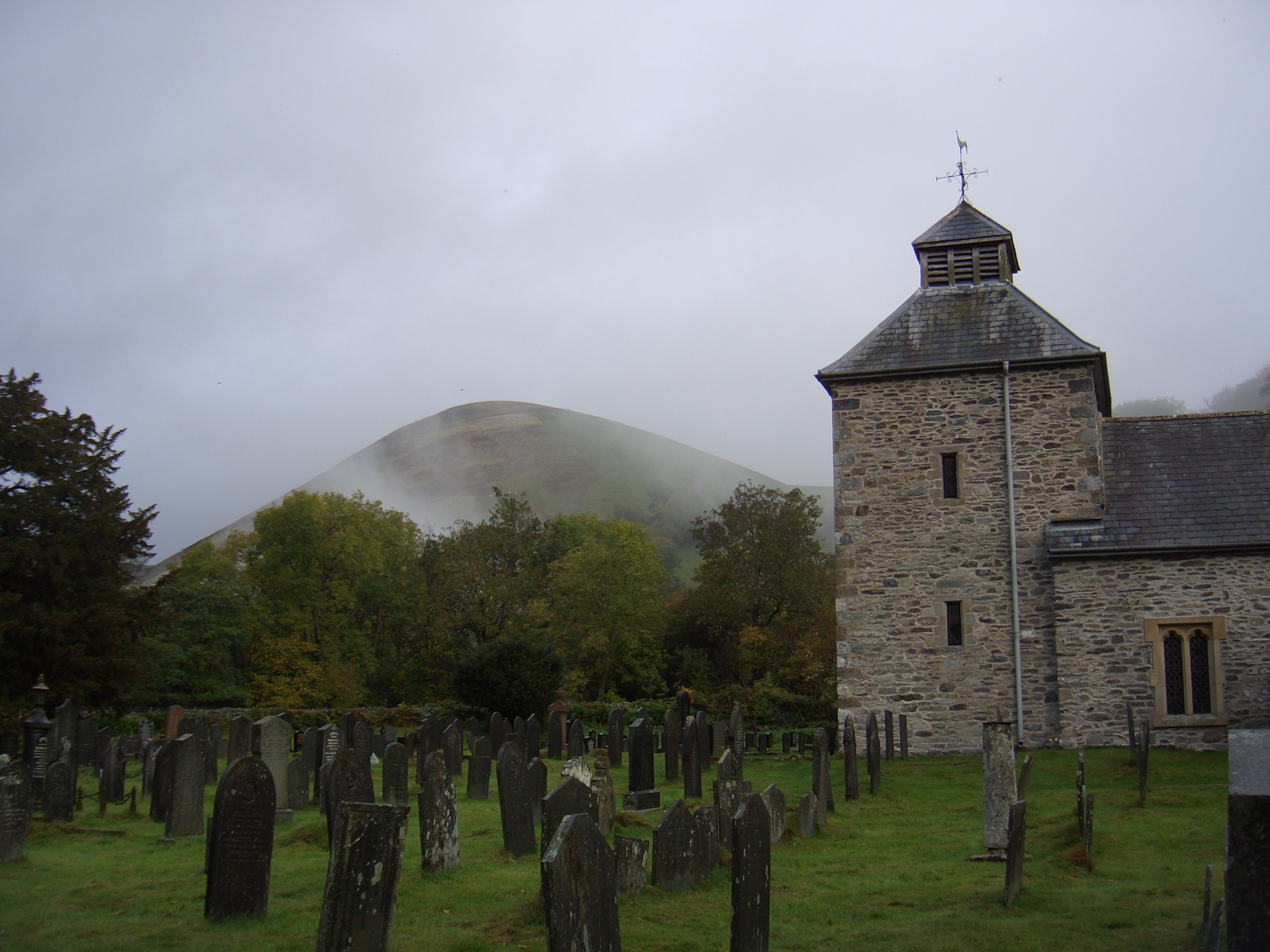
Church tower at Pennant Melangell with the breast-shaped hill in the background

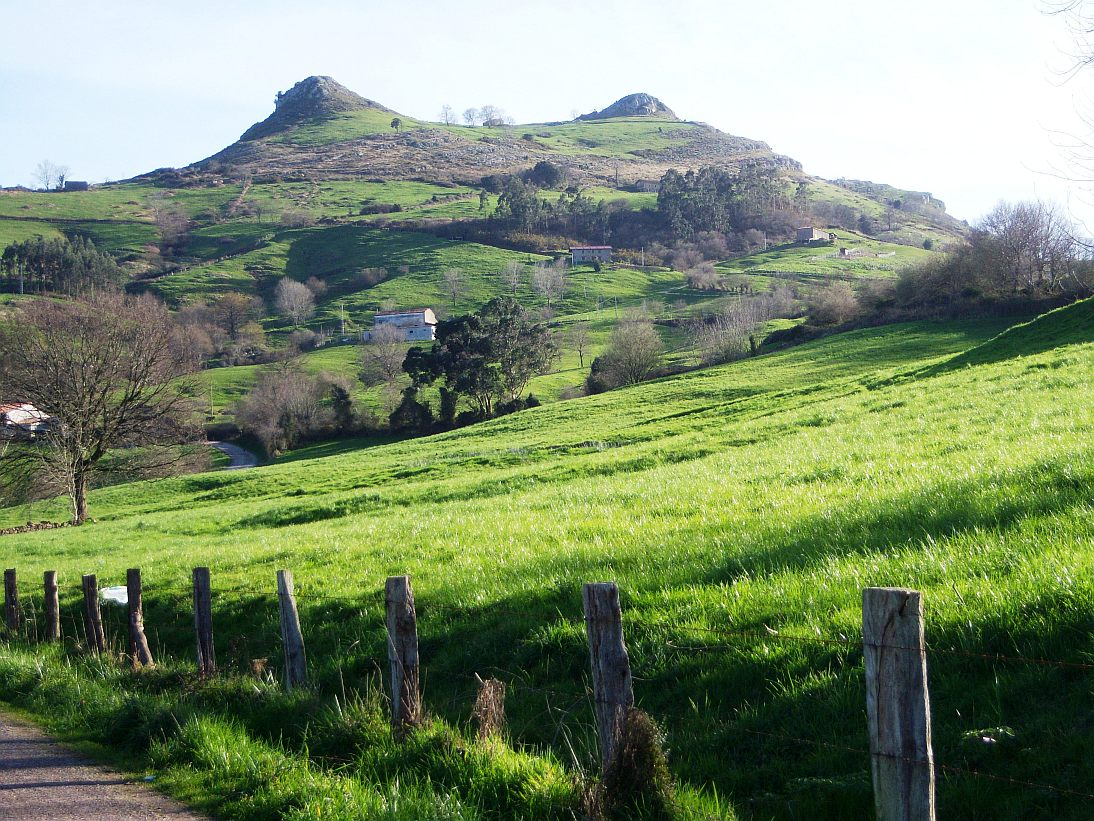
Las Tetas de Lierganes, Cantabria, Spain

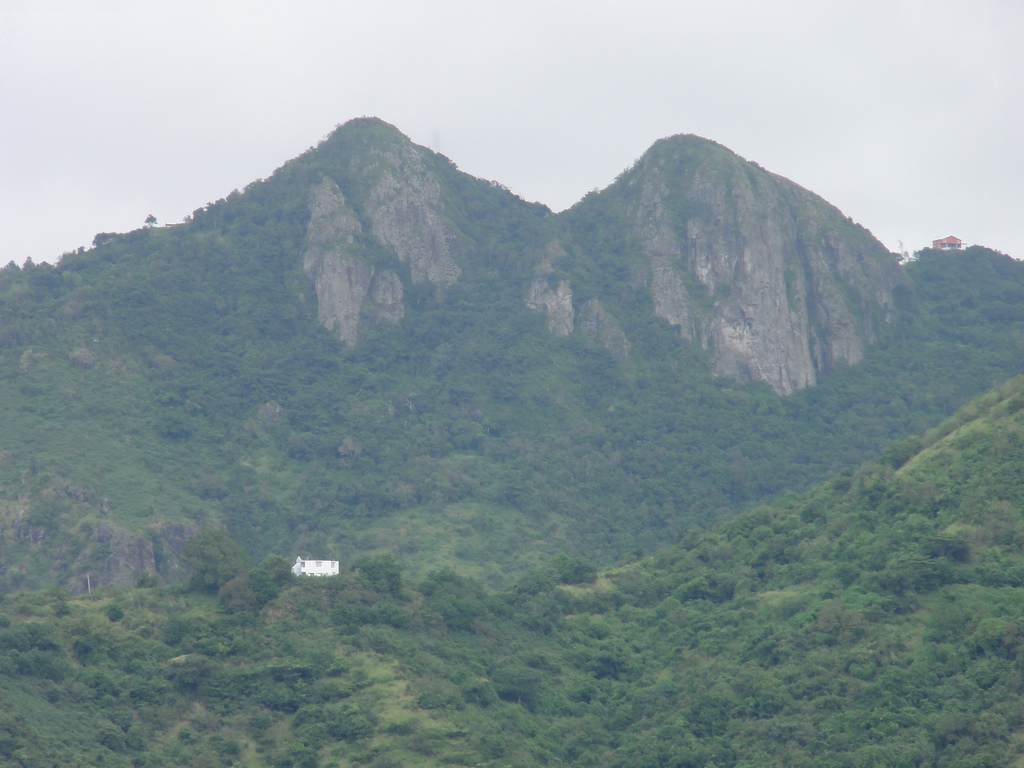
Cerro Las Tetas, Salinas, Puerto Rico, as seen from the Puerto Rico Highway 52 northbound rest area at a distance of 49 km

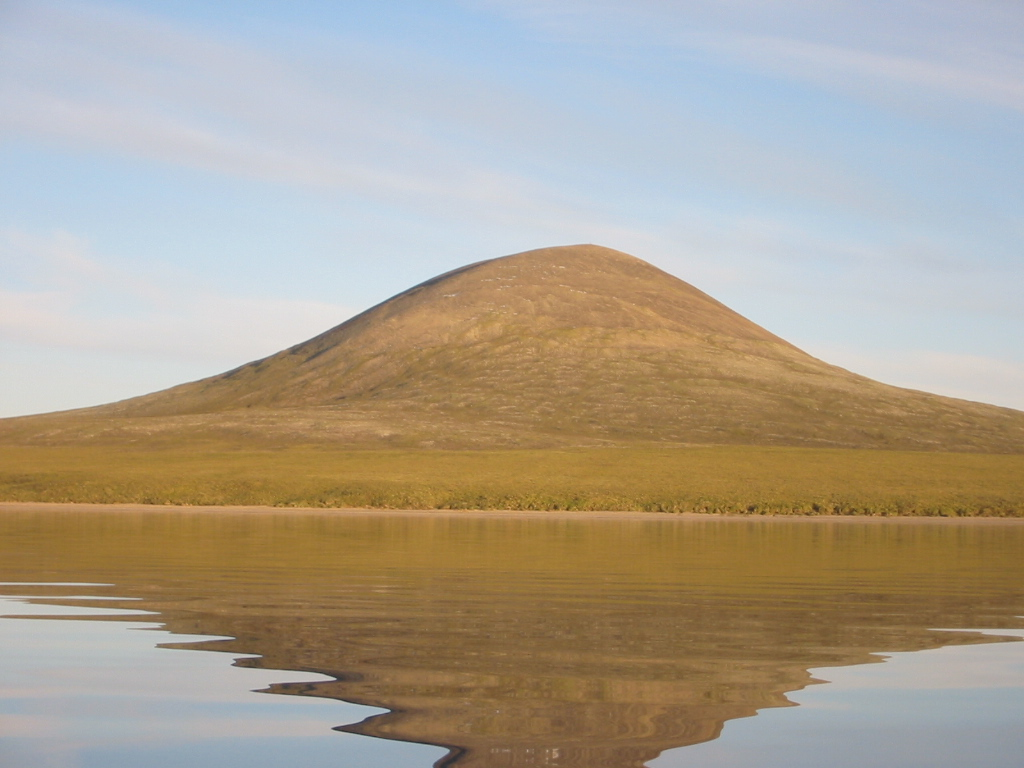
Hill by Lake Elgygytgyn, Chukotka, Russia

== See also ==
- Inselberg
- Maiden Paps
- Mamelon (fort)
- Mamelon (volcanology)
- Mamucium
- Mountains and hills of Scotland
- Phallic Rock, a rock in Arizona, United States
- St Melangell's Church
- The Sleeping Lady
