= Maiden Pap, Caithness =

Steep hill in Caithness, Scotland

Coordinates: 58°14′34″N 3°37′21″W

Maiden Pap
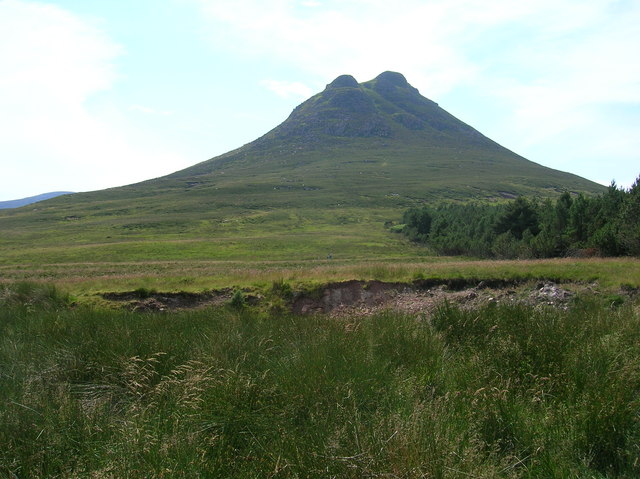
- Maiden Pap

Highest point
- Elevation: 484 m (1,588 ft)
- Prominence: 169 m (554 ft)
- Listing: Marilyn, Breast-shaped hills

Geography
- Location: Caithness, Scotland
- Parent range: Northwest Highlands
- OS grid: ND048293

Climbing
- First ascent: Unknown
- Easiest route: From Braemore

The Maiden Pap is a hill located in Caithness, Scotland. It is an inselberg, formed of Devonian conglomerates, rising steeply out of the surrounding plain and visible from as far away as Hoy and the Moray Firth. The Pap is so named because its shape resembles that of a human breast.

== See also ==
- Paps of Anu
- Pap of Glencoe
- Paps of Jura
- Breast-shaped hill
