= Maiden Paps =

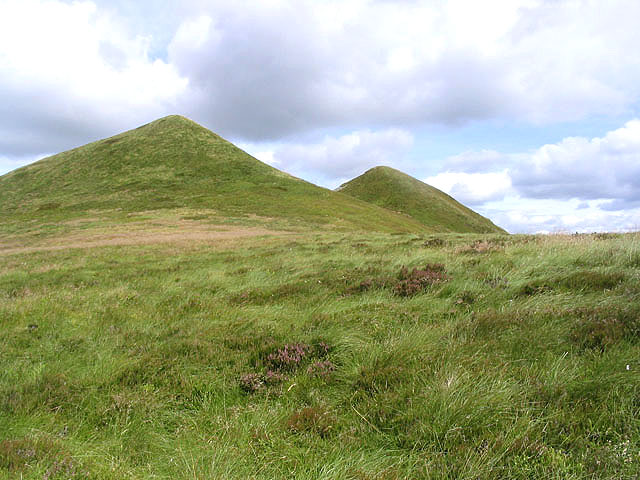
The Maiden Paps near Hawick

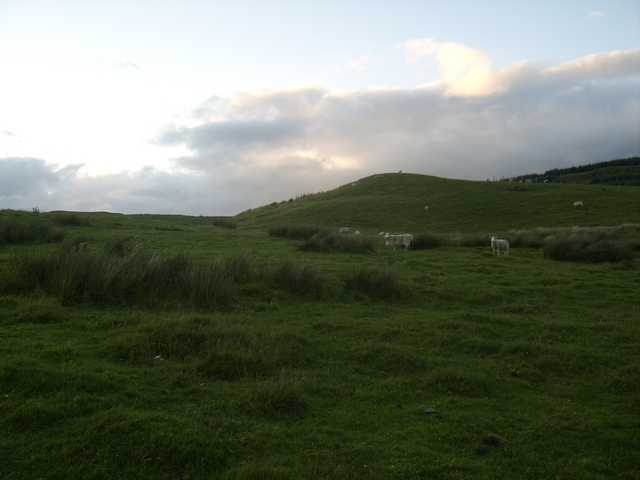
Maidens Paps cairn in the Kilpatrick Hills

Maiden Paps, Maidens Paps or Maiden's Pap may refer to:

- Maidens Paps, a cairn near Cochno Loch in the Kilpatrick Hills, Scotland
- Maiden Paps, Hawick, twin hills south of Hawick in the Scottish Borders, Scotland
- Maidens Paps, another name for the Tunstall Hills, Sunderland, Tyne and Wear, England
- Maiden Pap, Caithness, a hill in Caithness, Scotland
- Maiden Pap, another name for Schiehallion, Perth and Kinross, Scotland

== See also ==
- Breast-shaped hill
- Paps of Anu
- Pap of Glencoe
- Paps of Jura
