= Mount Susong Dalaga =

Mount Susong Dalaga or Bundok Susong Dalaga means "Maiden's Breasts Mountain" in Filipino and may refer to several summits in the Philippines, including:

- Mount Susong Dalaga, Abra de Ilog, Occidental Mindoro
- Mount Susong Dalaga, Doña Remedios Trinidad, Bulacan
- Mount Susong Dalaga, also known as Breast Peak, in Tampakan, South Cotabato
- Susong Dalaga Peak of Mount Batolusong, Tanay, Rizal
- Manabu Peak, also known as Mount Dalaga or Mount Susong Dalaga, of the Malepunyo Mountain Range in between the provinces of Batangas, Laguna, and Quezon
- Mount Malasimbo, also known as Mount Susong Dalaga, of the Zambales Mountain Range in Bataan
- Mount Tagapo, also known as Susong Dalaga Mountain, in Talim Island, Rizal

== See also ==
- Breast-shaped hill
