= Stobs railway station =

Disused railway station in Barnes, Scottish Borders

Stobs

General information
- Location: Barnes, Scottish Borders; Scotland
- Coordinates: 55.3788°N 2.7827°W
- Grid reference: NT505097
- Platforms: 2

Other information
- Status: Disused

History
- Original company: Border Union Railway
- Pre-grouping: North British Railway
- Post-grouping: London and North Eastern Railway; British Rail (Scottish Region)

Key dates
- 1 July 1862: Opened as Barnes
- September 1862: Name changed to Stobs
- 6 January 1969: Closed
Location

Stobs railway station served the hamlet of Barnes, Scottish Borders, Scotland from 1862 to 1969 on the Border Union Railway.

== History ==
The station opened on 1 July 1862 by the Border Union Railway. The station was situated at the end of a short access road off an unnamed minor dead-end road to Barnes and west of the B6399. The station was originally called Barnes, but the name was changed to Stobs in September 1862. The station was busy during the First World War and the Second World War due to the site being close to Stobs army training camp. The camp opened in 1903 and closed in 1959. The goods yard consisted of a single siding behind the down platform and near a cattle dock. The station was downgraded to an unstaffed halt on 3 July 1961, although the suffix 'halt' never actually appeared in its name. The station closed to passengers and goods traffic on 6 January 1969.

Preceding station	Disused railways	Following station
Hawick; Line and station closed	North British Railway; Border Union Railway	Shankend; Line and station closed
