= Turó de la Mamella =

Mountain in Spain

- Location within Spain

Highest point
- Elevation: 806 m (2,644 ft)
- Coordinates: 41°37′44″N 1°57′45″E

Geography
- Location: Vallès Occidental, Catalonia
- Parent range: Serra de l'Obac

Geology
- Mountain type: Conglomerate

Climbing
- First ascent: Unknown
- Easiest route: From Vacarisses

Turó de la Mamella is a mountain of Catalonia, Spain. Located in the Terrassa and Vacarisses municipal limits, it is one of the foothills of the Serra de l'Obac, Catalan Pre-Coastal Range, and has an elevation of 806.6 metres (2,646 ft) above sea level.

This mountain is part of the Llorenç del Munt and L'Obac Natural Park.

== See also ==
- Mountains of Catalonia
- Breast-shaped hill
