= Hawick railway station =

Disused railway station in Hawick, Scottish Borders

Hawick
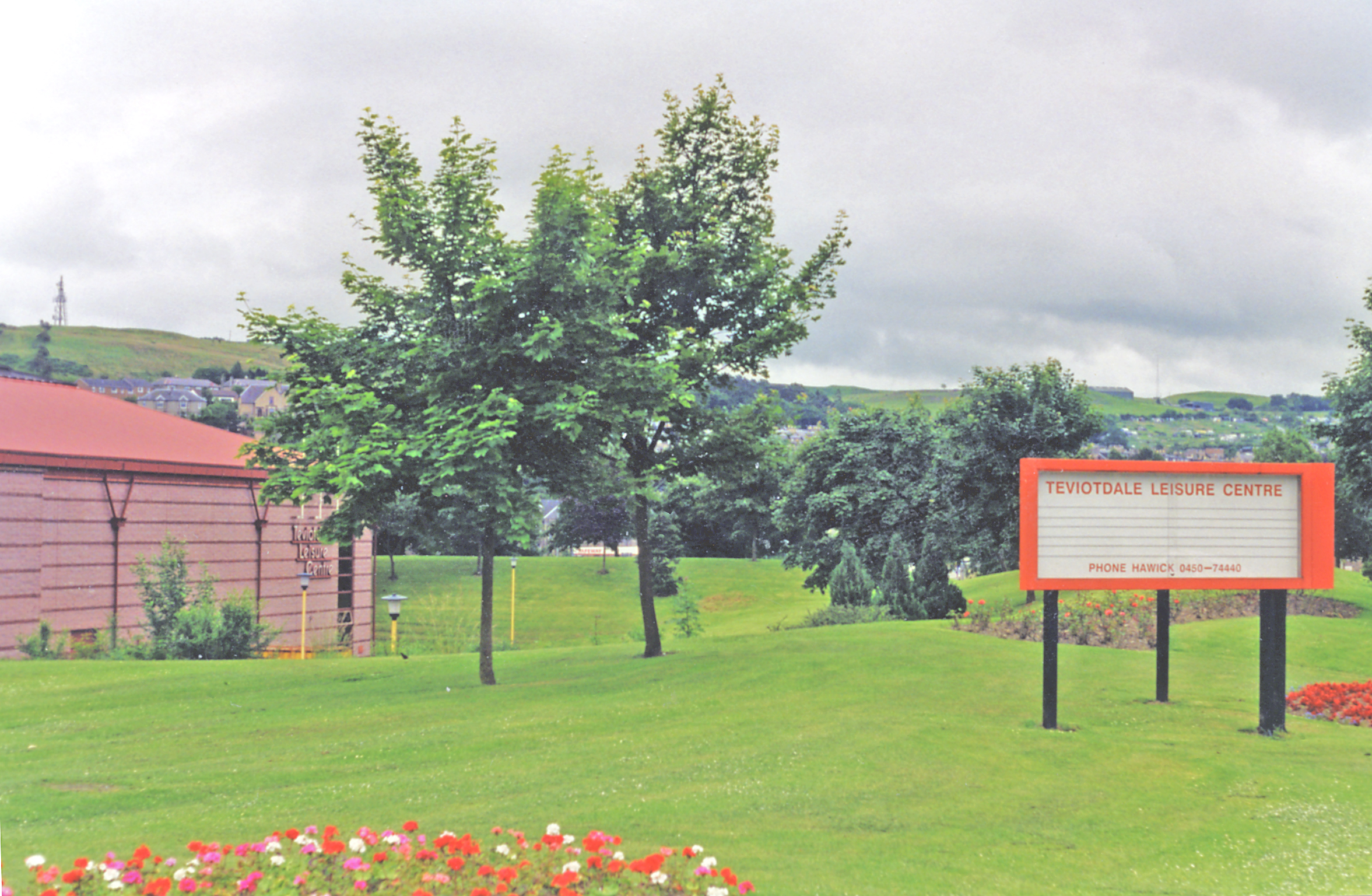
- The site of Hawick station in 1998, now Teviot Leisure Centre

General information
- Location: Hawick, Scottish Borders; Scotland
- Coordinates: 55.4291°N 2.7836°W
- Grid reference: NT505153
- Platforms: 2

Other information
- Status: Disused

History
- Original company: North British Railway
- Pre-grouping: North British Railway
- Post-grouping: LNER; British Rail (Scottish Region)

Key dates
- 1 November 1849: First station opened
- 1 July 1862: Resited
- 6 January 1969: Closed to passengers
- 28 April 1969: Closed completely
- TBA: Potential Reopening
Location

Hawick railway station served the town of Hawick, Scottish Borders, Scotland from 1849 to 1969 on the Waverley Route. It has been proposed that it could re-open as an extension to the Borders Railway, and a feasibility study is currently underway.

== History ==
The first station opened on 1 November 1849 as a terminus of the line from Edinburgh. It was located just to the north of North Bridge on Dovemount Place. There was no public celebration in Hawick, due to an outbreak of Cholera in the town.

The second station was built close to the first station for the through line southwards and opened on 1 July 1862 by the North British Railway. The station was situated on the north side of Mansfield Road. The goods yard had a large stone goods shed and two sidings running through it. On the north side of the goods shed were a further five sidings and a large dock. A private siding served Mansfield Gas Works.

In 1914 the North British Railway company implemented some improvements at the station. A new booking hall was erected and subways constructed at the south end of the platform, allowing the removal of an old overhead footbridge. There was an electric hoist for baggage at the north end of the station. The signal box was raised in height and enlarged, and the platform canopies were extended. One of the most striking improvements was the installation of high-pressure incandescent gas-lighting. This was the first such installation in Scotland. Altogether 175 separate lamps varying from 800 to 1000 candle-power were installed. The cost of the alterations was around £5,000 (equivalent to £500,000 in 2025). The contractor was J. Marshall and Son of Hawick.

On 4 January 1969, two days before its closure to passengers, a group of protesters gathered on the platform, with a black coffin addressed to Richard Marsh, who was the Minister of Transport at the time. It was sent south by train. The last passenger service was a sleeper service from Edinburgh Waverley to London St Pancras. A lot of local people gathered to say farewell when it reached Hawick at 23:27. The station closed to goods traffic on 28 April 1969.

=== Hawick Engine Shed ===
Hawick Engine Shed opened on 1 November 1849 and had a depot code of 64C. By 1948, the shed had an allocation of 26 locomotives. The shed closed on 3 January 1966, although it was still used as a booking-on point for train crews until the closure of the line.

=== Stationmasters ===
- Mr. Richards ca. 1858 ca. 1859
- William Waldie ca. 1863 - 1870
- John McDonald ca. 1871
- Robert White 1874 - 1905
- Alexander Miller 1905 - 1915 (formerly station master at Polmont, afterwards station master at Kirkcaldy)
- Bailie James Hogg 1915 - 1931 (formerly station master at Polmont)
- Alexander Aitkinhead 1931 - 1942 (formerly station master at Bo’ness, West Lothian)
- T. Lawrence from 1942 (formerly station master at St Boswells)
- George Bell 1944 - 1951 (formerly station master at Eskbank, afterwards station master at Dundee Tay Bridge, Dundee West and Magdalen Green)
- Eric D. Parsons 1951 - 1954 (formerly station master at Batley, Yorkshire)
- Alexander Baxter from 1954 (formerly station master at Montrose)

Preceding station	Disused railways	Following station
Hassendean; Line and station closed	North British Railway; Waverley Route	Stobs; Line and station closed
