= Anu (Irish goddess) =

Irish goddess

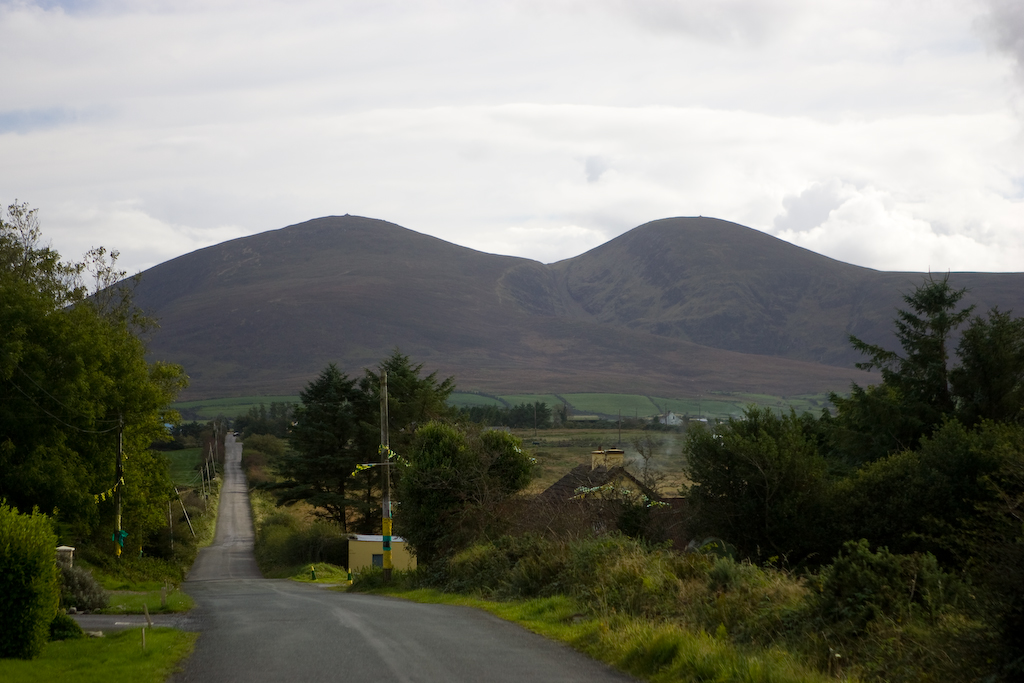
Paps of Anu

Anu or Ana (sometimes given as Anann or Anand) is the name of a goddess mentioned briefly in Irish mythology.

== Myths and sources ==
The 9th century Sanas Cormaic (Cormac's Glossary) says in its entry for her:

"Ana – mother of the gods of Ireland; well did she feed the gods".

She may be a goddess in her own right, or an alternate name for Danu. In the Lebor Gabála Érenn, Anand is given as another name for The Morrígan. As her name is often conflated with a number of other goddesses, it is not always clear which figure is being referred to if the name is taken out of context. The name may be derived from the Proto-Celtic theonym *Φanon-.

Anu has particular associations with Munster: the pair of breast shaped hills known as the Paps of Anu (Dá Chích Anann or "the breasts of Anu") in County Kerry are said to have been named after her.

Her name has the meaning of "wealth, riches, and prosperity." Leaving her with a title of being the goddess of "good fortune and prosperity" in the land of Munster.

While an Irish goddess, in Scotland (Alba) a similar figure is referred to as "Gentle Annie", in an effort to avoid offence, a tactic which is similar to referring to the fairies as "The Good People".

== Bibliography ==
- MacKillop, James (1998). Dictionary of Celtic Mythology. Oxford, UK: Oxford University Press. ISBN 0-19-280120-1.
- Wood, Juliette (2002). The Celts: Life, Myth, and Art. Thorsons Publishers. ISBN 0-00-764059-5.
