= Danu (Irish goddess) =

Hypothesized Irish deity

*Danu ([ˈd̪anu]) is presumed to have been a goddess in Irish mythology, whose sole attestation is in the name of the Tuatha Dé Danann, which is usually translated 'the folk of the goddess Danu'. Despite the complete absence of any such figure from the primary texts, some later Victorian folklorists attempted to ascribe certain attributes to Danu, such as association with motherhood or agricultural prosperity. (Note: "Danu herself probably represented the earth and its fruitfulness, and one might compare her with the Greek Demeter. All the other gods are, at least by title, her children." – Squire (1905))

== Etymology ==
The hypothetical nominative form of the name, *Danu, is not found in any medieval Irish text, but is rather a reconstruction by modern scholars based on the genitive Danann (also spelled Donand or Danand), which is the only form attested in the primary sources (e.g. in the collective name of the Irish gods, Tuatha Dé Danann, "folk of the goddess Danu"). In Irish mythology, Anu (sometimes declined as Anann or Anand) is a goddess. She may be a distinct goddess in her own right or an alternative name for Danu, in which case Danu could be a contraction of *di[a] Anu ("goddess Anu"). It may also be a confusion arising from Anu and the phrase na trí dée dána.

The etymology of the name has been a matter of much debate since the 19th century, with some earlier scholars favoring a link with the Vedic water goddess Danu, whose name is derived from the Proto-Indo-European root *dʰenh₂- "to run, to flow", which may also lie behind the ancient name for the river Danube, Danuuius – perhaps of Celtic origin, though it is also possible that it is an early Scythian loanword in Celtic.

MacLeod connects Danu to the Old Irish word dán, which refers to an artistic skill. In early Ireland, artisans and other skilled workers were known as aes dána, or "people of skill".

Linguist Eric Hamp rejects the traditional etymologies in his 2002 examination of the name Danu, and proposes instead that *Danu is derived from the same root as Latin bonus (Old Latin duenos) from Proto-Indo-European *dueno- "good", via a Proto-Celtic nominative singular n-stem *Duonū ("aristocrat").

== In mythology ==
Danu has no surviving myths or legends associated with her in any of the medieval Irish texts.

=== Anu and Danand in Irish texts ===
Cormac's Glossary, a text that predates the Lebor Gabala Erenn, names the goddess Anu as the mother of the gods. (Note: If the reconstructed name *Danu refers to the goddess Anu, then Danu might be a contracted form of the Old Irish phrase *d[ia] Anu ("god Anu") or *[ban]d[ia] Anu ("goddess Anu").) Some scholars suggest that Danu was a conflation of Anu and is the same goddess. This may also connect Danu to The Morrígan, which some scholars say is an epithet for Anu.

The closest figure in Irish texts to a Danu would then be Danand, daughter of Delbáeth. In the Lebor Gabála Érenn (The Book of the Taking of Ireland), it is noted the Tuatha Dé Danann get their name from Danand and Delbáeth's three sons: Brian, Iuchar, and Iucharba. These three are called the "Gods of Dannan". MacLeod notes that Danu's three sons might be better fit by the craftsmen deities, Goibniu, Luchta, and Creidhne and suggests that the gods of Danu may refer to them.

Anu's association with fertility can be seen in relation to the Paps of Anu, Paps meaning "breasts."

Another possible match is in the Dindsenchas poem on Codal, which refers to a Danainn, wife of Ganaan. Danainn is the mother of a daughter named Gorn.

=== Welsh parallels ===
She has possible parallels with the Welsh legendary figure Dôn in the medieval tales of the Mabinogion, whom most modern scholars consider to be a mythological mother goddess. This may be supported by theories that Dôn's name may also come from a root referring to rivers. This connection also supports the theory that the gods of skill associated with Danu are Goibhniu and his two brothers, as one of Dôn's offspring is Gofannon, the Welsh equivalent of Goibhniu.

However, Dôn's gender is not specified in the Mabinogion, and some medieval Welsh antiquarians presumed Dôn to be male.

== See also ==
- Anu (Irish goddess)
- Danu (Asura)
- Dôn (Welsh deity)
- Donn
