= Naasa Hablood =

Twin hills in Maroodi Jeex, Somalia

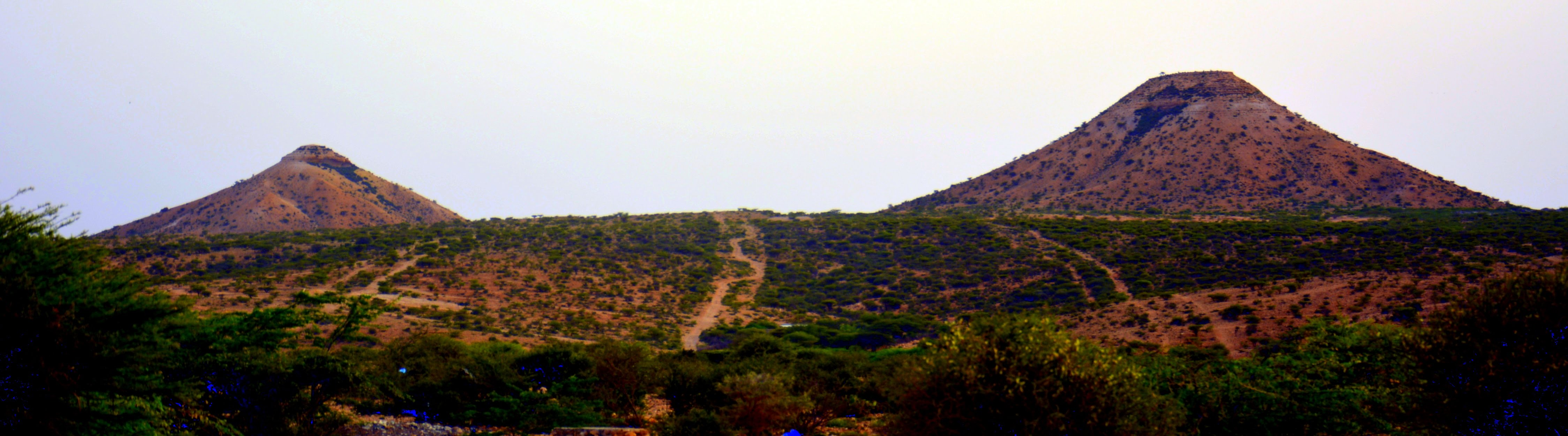
- Naasa Hablood in 2017

Highest point
- Coordinates: 9°35′37″N 44°07′15″E

Geography
- Location within Somaliland
- Location: Somaliland

Climbing
- Easiest route: Hike

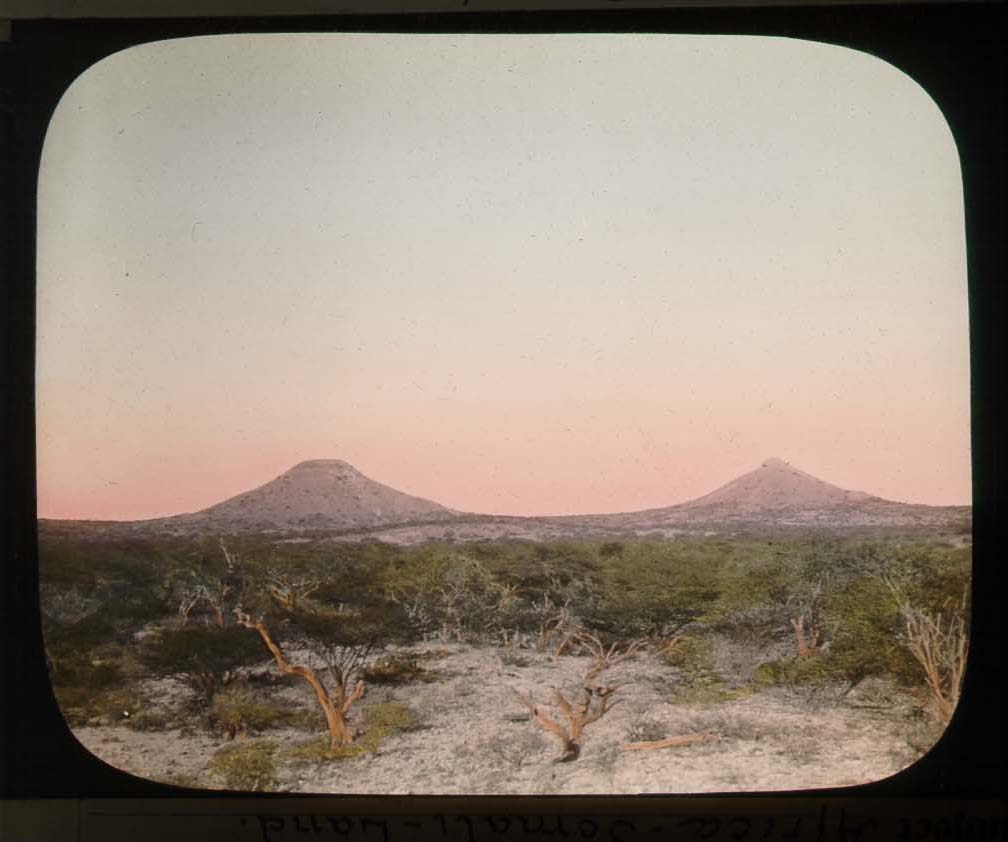
Naasa Hablood in 1896

Naasa Hablood (Somali: Naaso Hablood) are twin hills situated in Maroodi Jeex, Somaliland. Located on the outskirts of the city of Hargeisa, they are made of granite and sand. The hills are named Naasa Hablood (lit. 'Woman's Breasts') due to their distinctive conical shape and resemblance to thelarchic breast. Although the root word habar means 'an older woman; a mother', the name has often been mistranslated as Virgin's Breasts or Girl's Breasts.

== See also ==
- Breast-shaped hills
