= Tunstall Hills =

Open space in Sunderland, Tyne and Wear, England

- Urban open space
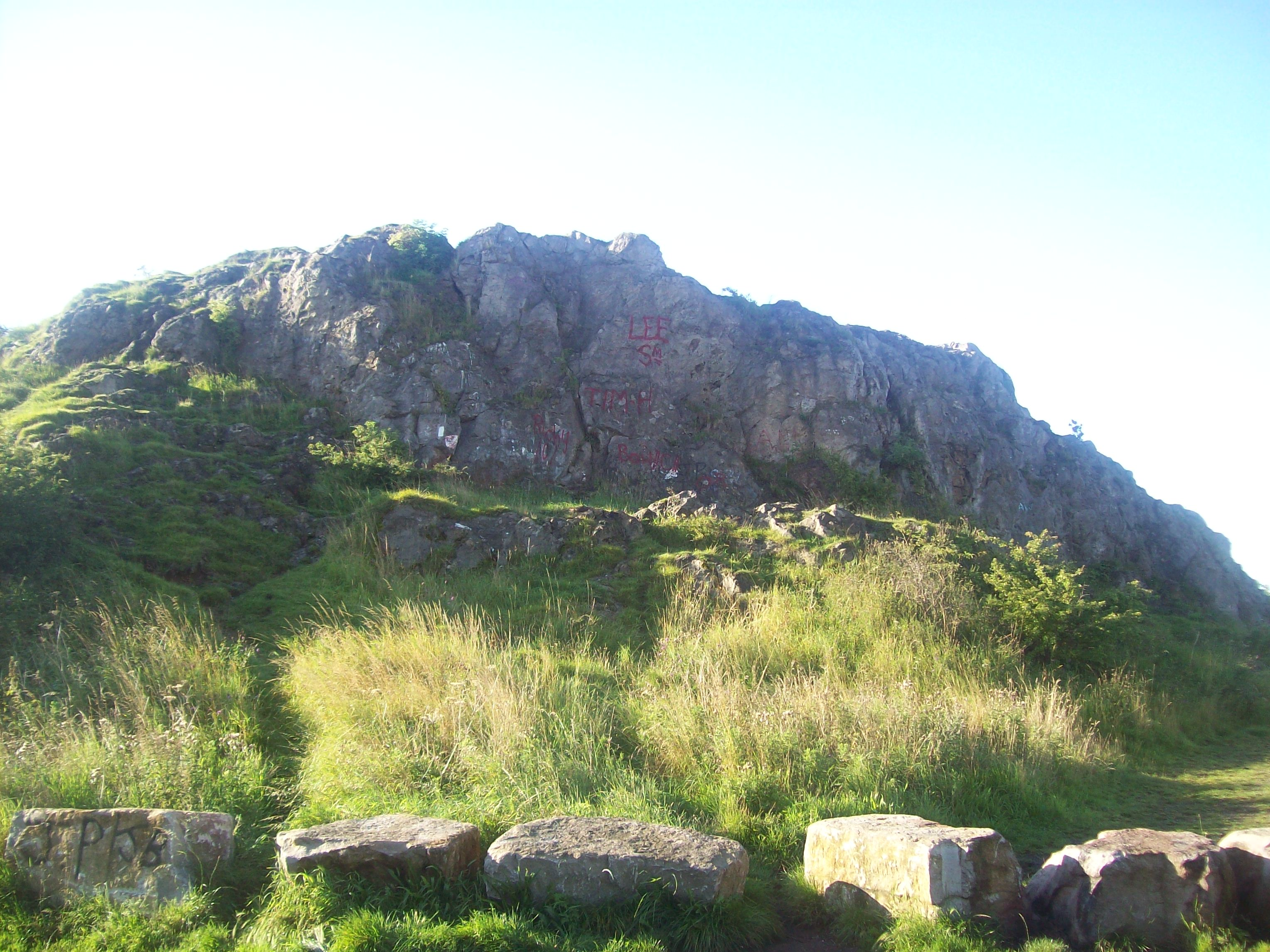
- Rocky Hill

- Location in Tyne and Wear
- Coordinates: 54.884°N 1.390°W
- Grid position: NZ392545
- Location: Tyne and Wear, England, UK

Tunstall Hills is an area of open space in Sunderland, Tyne and Wear, England. It is a Local Nature Reserve and Tunstall Hills And Ryhope Cutting has been designated a Site of Special Scientific Interest both for its geological and biological importance. The area consists of Green Hill and Rocky Hill and surrounding land.

Historically these hills have been also named the Maidens Paps because of their shape.

== Flora ==
Gentle slopes on the Maiden Paps support species-rich Magnesian Limestone grassland dominated by upright brome Bromus erectus, blue moor-grass Sesleria albicans, crested hair-grass Koeleria macrantha, red fescue Festuca rubra, glaucous sedge Carex flacca and herbs such as common rock-rose Helianthemum nummularia, salad burnet Sanguisorba minor, fairy flax Linum catharticum, wild thyme Thymus praecox, pignut Conopodium majus, small scabious Scabiosa columbaria and sea plantain Plantago maritima. Of particular note is a small population of perennial flax Linum anglicum, which occurs here towards the northern limit of its distribution range in Great Britain, and locally uncommon plants such as frog orchid Coeloglossum viride, autumn gentian Gentianella amarella, purple milk-vetch Astragalus danicus and thrift Armeria maritima. Steep south-facing slopes above the reclaimed railway line support a more open, herb-rich grassland characterised by common quaking-grass Briza media, blue moorgrass, crested hair-grass and red fescue with yarrow Achillea millefolium, hairy violet Viola hirta, hoary ragwort Senecio erucifolius, and fragrant orchid Gymnadenia conopsea. Other uncommon plants include pale St. John's-wort Hypericum montanum, lesser meadow-rue Thalictrum minus, and black bryony Tamus communis.

== Land ownership ==
All land within Tunstall Hills and Ryhope Cutting SSSI is owned by the local authority.

== See also ==
- List of mountains in England
- Maiden Paps
- Breast shaped hills
