= Maiden Paps (Hawick) =

Twin Hills in Scottish Borders

Coordinates: 55°18′46.31″N 2°47′18.68″W

Maiden Paps, Hawick
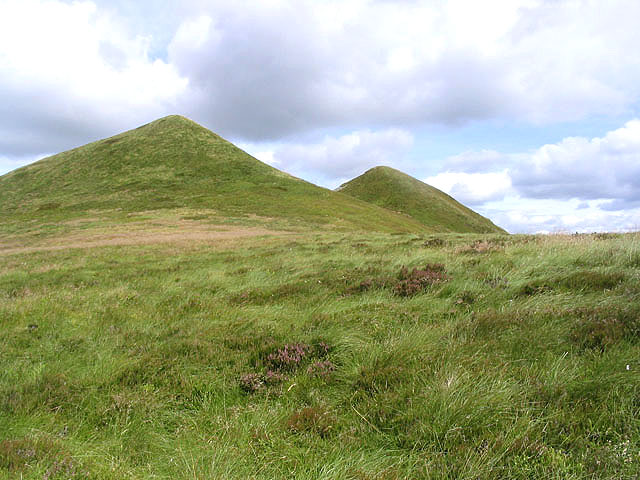
- View of the Maiden Paps from moorland terrain north of Scaw'd Law

Highest point
- Elevation: 510 m (1,670 ft)
- Listing: Breast-shaped hills

Geography
- Location: Hawick, Scotland
- Parent range: Southern Uplands

Climbing
- First ascent: Unknown
- Easiest route: From Hawick

The Maiden Paps are twin hills near Hawick, in the Scottish Borders of the south east of Scotland, so named because they have the shape of human breasts. They are located 12 kilometres (7.5 mi) south of Hawick; the higher pap is 510 metres (1,670 ft) and the lower 500 metres (1,600 ft) high.

Although there are some well-defined hills like the Maiden Paps, the Roxburgh Hills are gently rolling for the most part, like much of the Southern Uplands. Due to the surrounding landscape, hills such as the Maiden Paps tend to look more prominent than they actually are.

The Maiden Paps are relatively close to Shankend (3.5 kilometres (2.2 mi) to the NE) and to the Hermitage Castle (6 kilometres (3.7 mi) to the south); these are two places with a sinister reputation.

== See also ==
- Paps of Anu
- Pap of Glencoe
- Paps of Jura
- Breast-shaped hill
