= Isanaklesh Peaks =

Landform in Maricopa County, Arizona

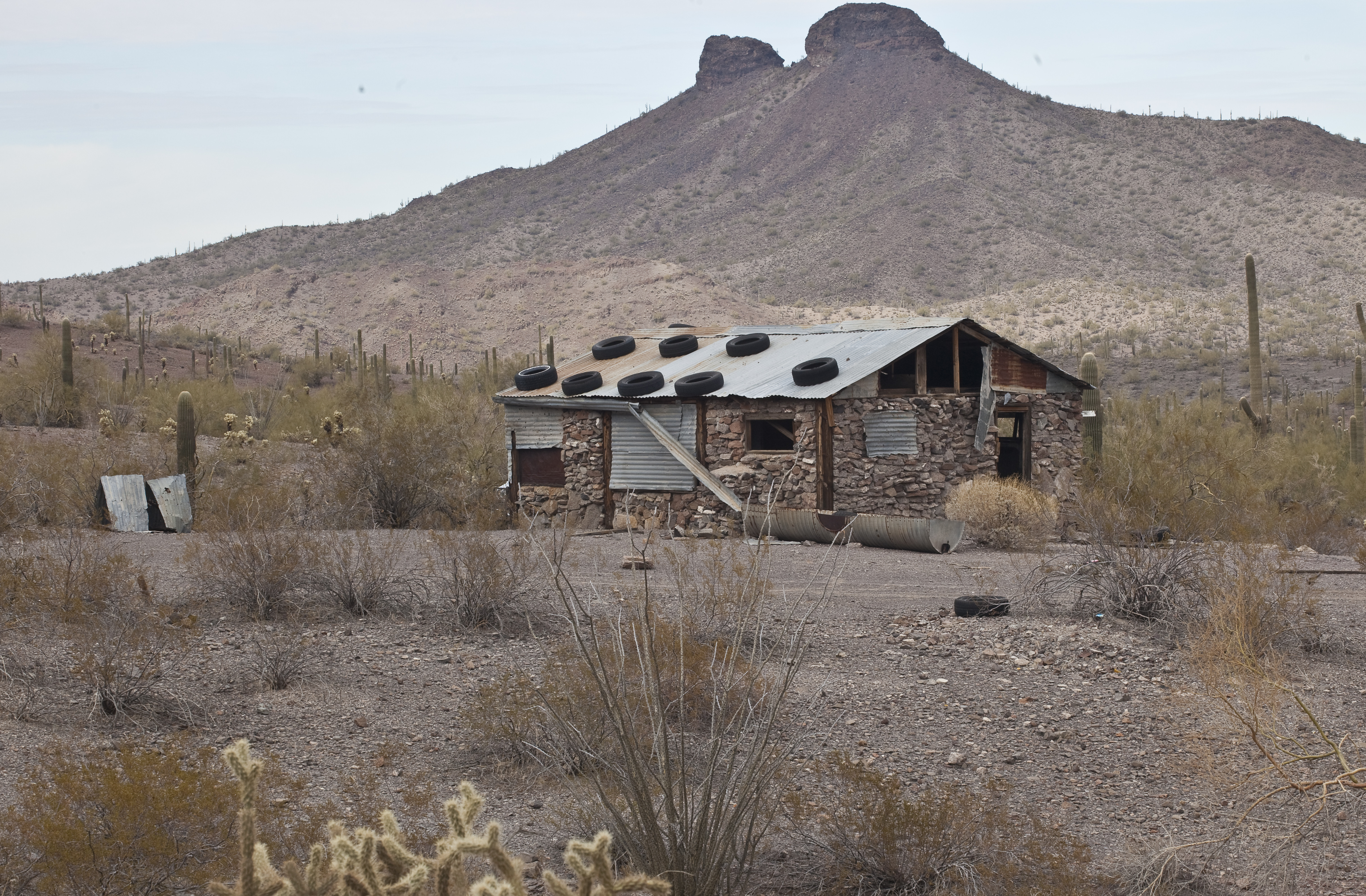
- Isanaklesh Peaks as seen in January 2010

Highest point
- Elevation: 2,478 ft (755 m) NGVD 29
- Prominence: 778 ft (237 m)
- Coordinates: 32°50′55″N 112°28′34″W

Geography
- Location within Arizona
- Location: Maricopa County, Arizona, U.S.
- Parent range: San Tank Mountains
- Topo map: USGS Big Horn

Isanaklesh Peaks, formerly known as Squaw Tits, is a summit in Maricopa County, Arizona, in the United States. with an elevation of 2,478 feet (755 m).

The peak was named from its resemblance to a human breast. However, the term squaw is a derogatory racial epithet targeting the Indigenous people of North America, and Indigenous women in particular.

== See also ==
- Breast-shaped hill
- Grand Tetons
