= Khao Nom Nang, Tha Kradan =

Mountain in Thailand

Khao Nom Nang เขานมนาง
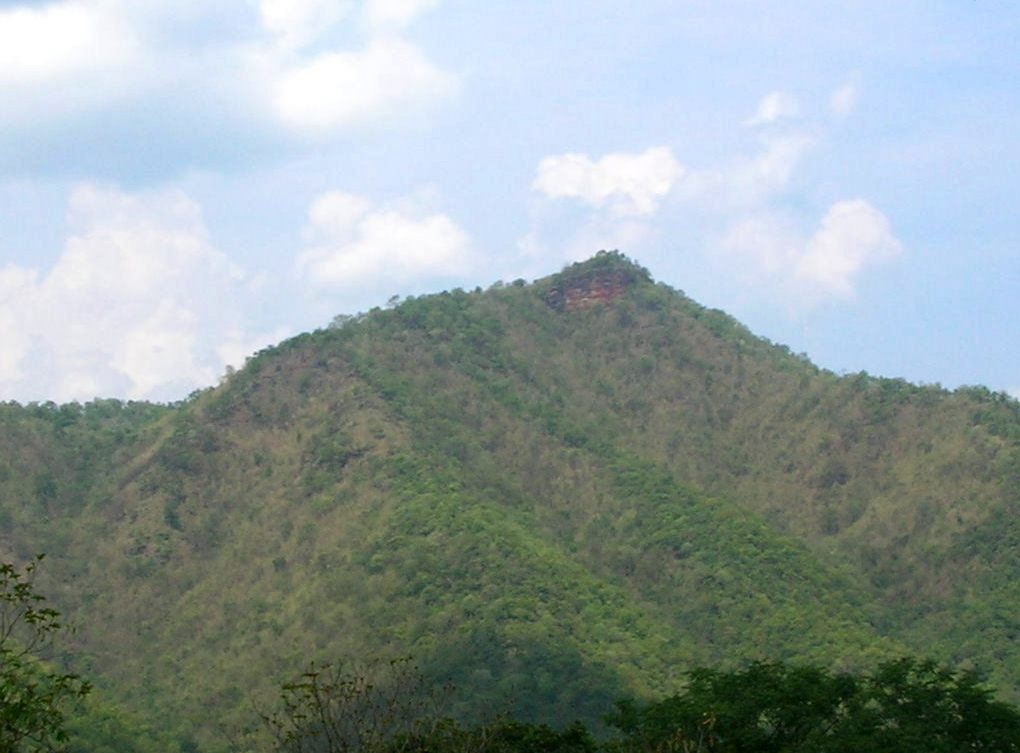

Highest point
- Elevation: 752 m (2,467 ft)
- Coordinates: 14°21′02″N 99°12′53″E

Geography
- Location within Thailand
- Location: Kanchanaburi, Thailand
- Parent range: Tenasserim Hills

Geology
- Mountain type: Limestone

Khao Nom Nang (Thai: เขานมนาง), "female breast mountain", is a 752 metres (2,467 ft) high mountain in the Tenasserim Hills in Kanchanaburi Province, Thailand.

== Description ==
Khao Nom Nang rises above the surrounding limestone hills between Nong Pet and Chong Sadao east of Route 3199. The mountain is in the Erawan National Park area.

== See also ==
- List of mountains in Thailand
- Breast-shaped hills
