= Pap (nickname) =

Pap is a nickname of:

- Benjamin "Pap" Singleton (1809–1892), African-American civil rights activist and businessman
- George Henry Thomas (1816–1870), Union general during the American Civil War
- Pap Dean (Preston Allen Dean; 1915–2011), American cartoonist
- Pap Finn, the father of Huckleberry Finn in Mark Twain novels
- Pap, a character in the 2021 play Fat Ham
