= Mamelon (fort) =

Type of fort

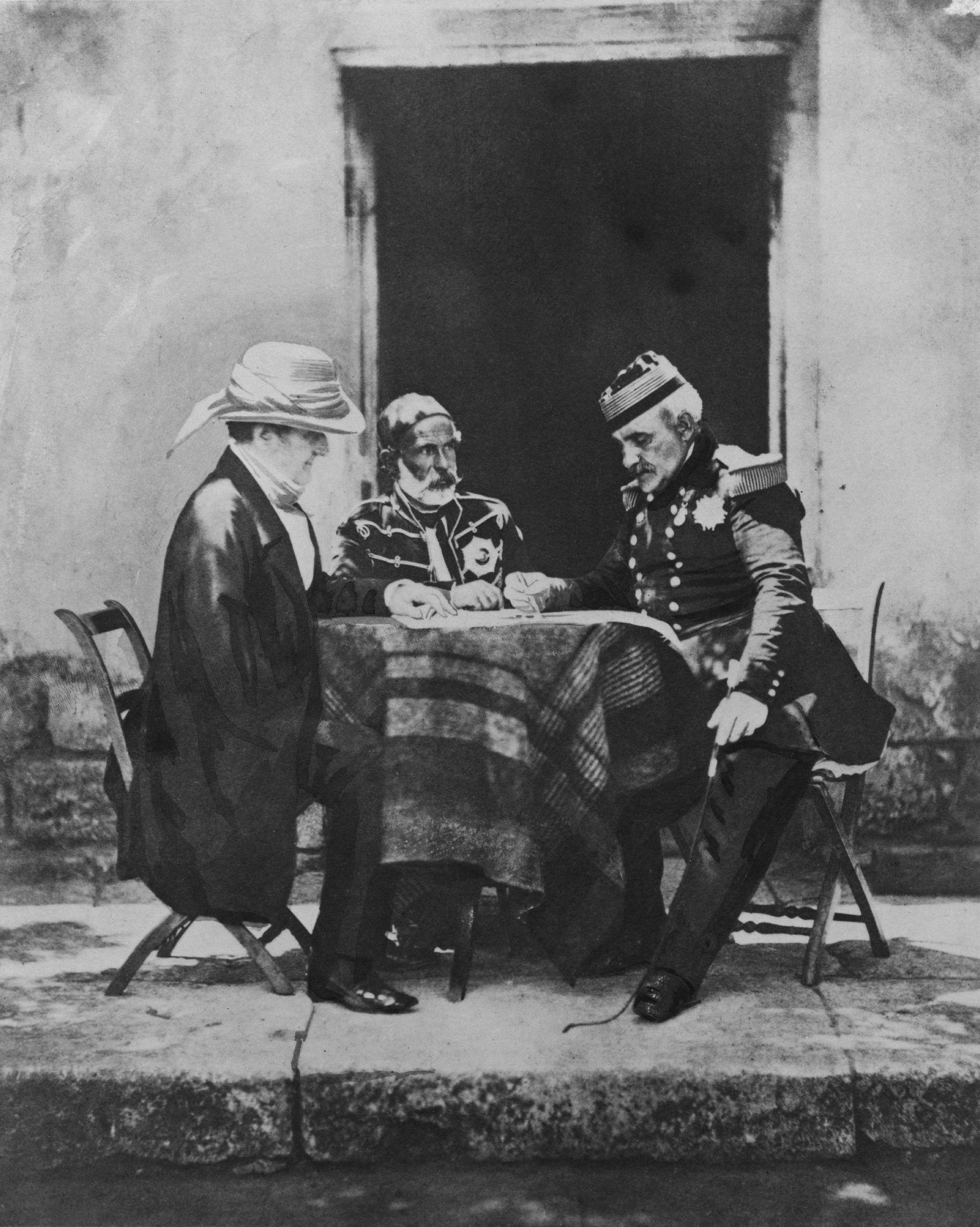
The Council of War on the day of the taking of the Mamelon Quarries, 7 June 1855 by Roger Fenton

A mamelon (from French 'nipple') is a French name for a breast shaped hillock. At the Siege of Sevastopol (1854–1855) during the Crimean War the French called a strategic hillock (location: 44.60048°N 33.55606°E) the Mamelon. The British adopted the French name for the hill, but also called it Gordon's Hill.

In October 1854 the French attempted to capture the summit of the hillock with a coup de main but were repulsed with casualties of about 600 officers and men. During the winter of 1854/55 the Russians built the Kamtschatka Redoubt on the summit of the Mamelon as part of a comprehensive defensive ring of double and in some parts triple lines of continuous defensive works around Sevastopol. During the campaign season of 1855, after two more failed attempts, and following a heavy bombardment and the capture of the outlying defences, the Kamtschatka Redoubt was stormed and captured by the French in early June. During the final assault, the British took some of the outlying works and suffered casualties of 30 officers and 350 other ranks; the French in the main assault deployed many more men and suffered about three times the British casualties.

== Cultural references ==
The word appears in the "Major-General's Song" from Gilbert and Sullivan's 1879 comic opera, The Pirates of Penzance, in which Major-General Stanley sings, "... In fact, when I know what is meant by mamelon and ravelin ..."
