= Mamelon (volcanology) =

Type of volcanic rock formation

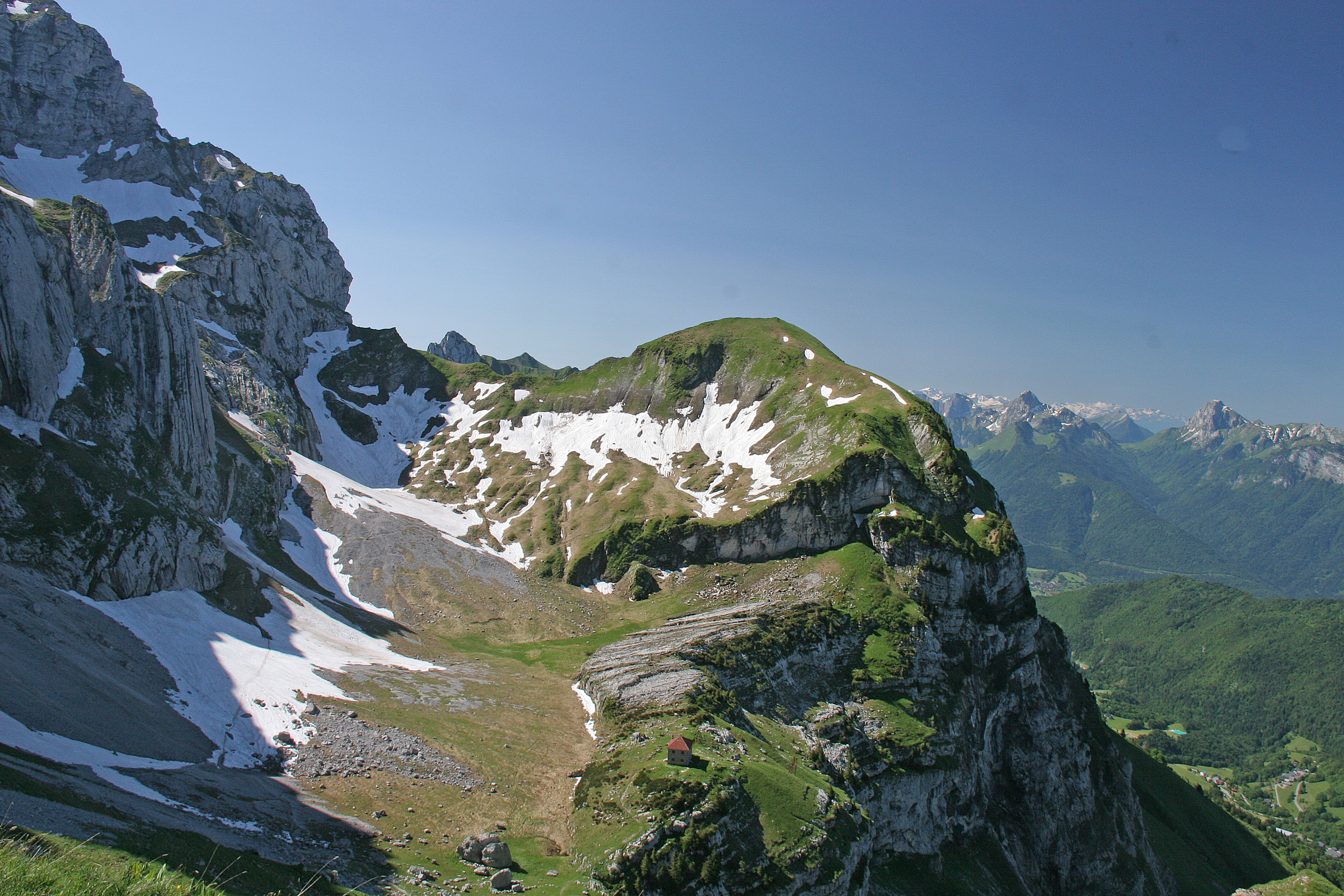
View of Le Mamelon Vert, La Tournette, France

A mamelon (from French mamelon, "nipple") is a rock formation created by eruption of relatively thick or stiff lava through a narrow vent in the bedrock. Because the lava is not fluid, it does not flow away, but congeals around the vent, forming a small hill or mound on the surface. The outflow from successive eruptions forms additional layers on top, and the resulting pile of layers may stand over 100 metres (330 ft) above the surrounding surface.

The term was coined by the French explorer and naturalist Jean Baptiste Bory de Saint-Vincent, to describe the central peak of the Dolomieu Crater in the Piton de la Fournaise volcano on Réunion.

Hanging Rock, in Victoria, Australia, is another example of a mamelon.

== See also ==
- Breast-shaped hill
