= Pap (given name) =

Pap is a given name. Notable people with the given name include:

- Pap of Armenia (353–374), Armenian king
- Pap Saine, Gambian newspaper editor and publisher
- Pap Cheyassin Secka (1942–2012), Gambian lawyer, politician, and Attorney General of the Gambia
