= Phallic Rock =

Geological feature in Carefree, Arizona, United States

Coordinates: 33°48′48.98″N 111°55′27.15″W

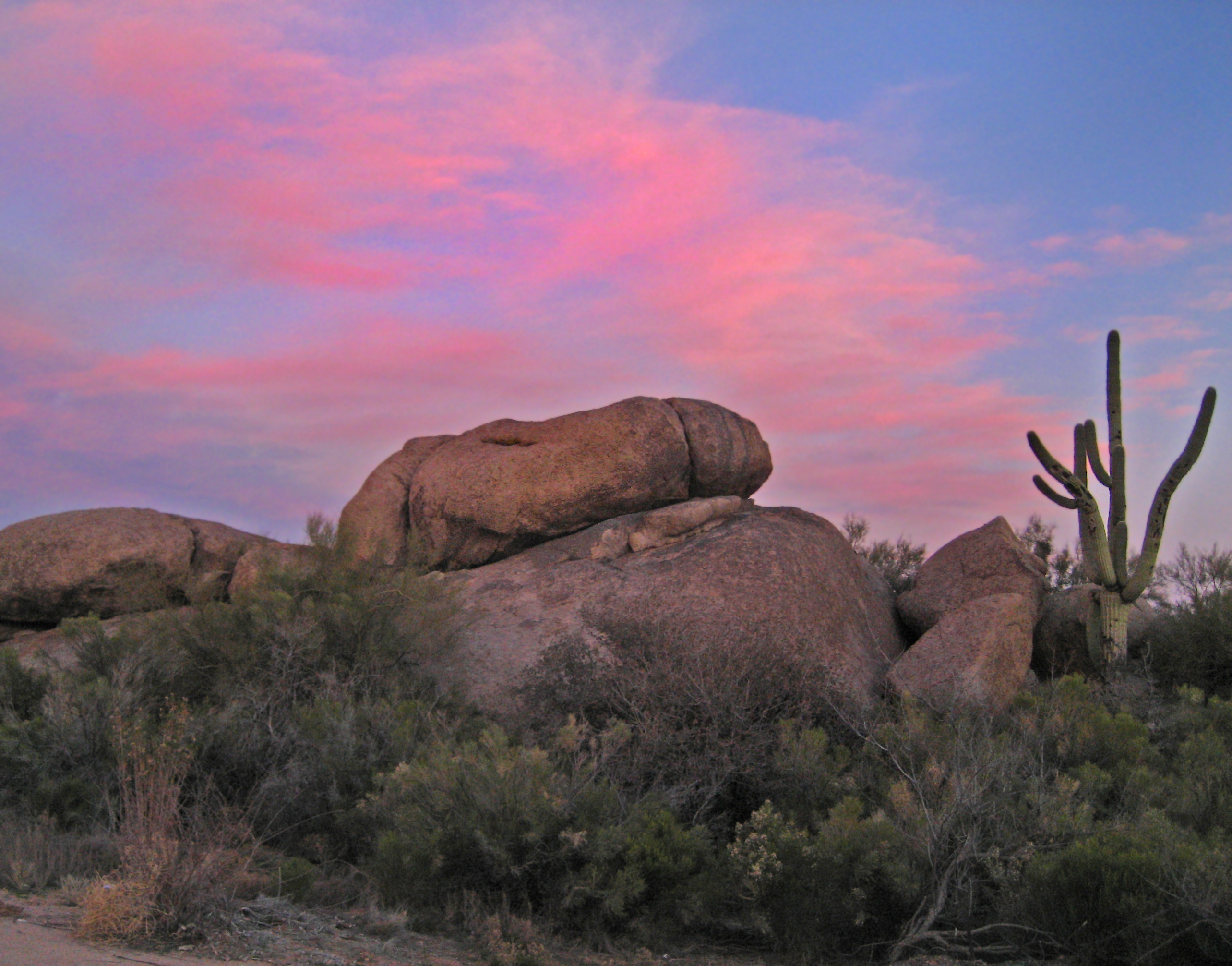
Image of Phallic Rock at sunset looking east.

Phallic Rock is a precambrian granite rock formation in Carefree, Arizona, United States. The formation is caused by spheroidal weathering whereby the composition of the granite and its crystal structure facilitated the development of rounded corners and its unique phallic tubular shape. The formation is at the eastern foot of Black Mountain and can be found approximately 400 ft (120 m) east of Tom Darlington Drive on Stagecoach Pass Road. The formation is best viewed from the western side looking east. There is a dirt pull-off on the side of Stagecoach Pass Road with enough room for several vehicles.

== Literature cited ==
- Esperança, S. and J. R. Holloway (1984) Lower crustal nodules from the Camp Creek latite, Carefree, Arizona. Kimberlites II: The mantle and cryst-mantle relationships. J. Kornprobst, Elsevier II: 219–227.
