= Shankend =

Shankend Manor
- Interactive map of the Shankend Manor area

General information
- Type: Mansion
- Location: Scotland
- Coordinates: 55.346°N 2.757°W
- Construction started: sixteenth-century

Shankend Manor was a sixteenth-century mansion located some six miles (ten kilometres) south of Hawick, close to Whitrope Siding in Scotland. It was constructed to manage the surrounding countryside and now overlooks the Edinburgh Waverley line. The manor fell into disuse during the 1930s and by the 1970s had been removed from local road maps. The Maiden Paps are located close to Shankend.

It was used to house German prisoners of war during World War I and has been reported to be haunted by their spirits.
