= Mollie's Nipple =

Geological features in Utah, United States

Mollie's Nipple or Molly's Nipple is the name given to as many as seven peaks, at least one butte, at least one well, and some other geological features in Utah. Some sources claim there are eleven geological features in Utah that bear this name. At least some of those names are attributed to John Kitchen – a pioneer of an early exploration of Utah, who named them to commemorate a nipple of his wife Molly.

== Utah Mollie's Nipples peaks listed by US Geological Survey ==
Note: the U.S. Board on Geographic Names discourages the use of the apostrophe in place names. This has not prevented some individuals and organizations from re-inserting apostrophes dropped from possessive place names on their own.

- USGS peak Mollies Nipple (5226 ft [1593 m], Milford Flat quad, in Beaver County, National Elevation Dataset 38.3749657°N 113.0741243°W)
- USGS peak Mollies Nipple (6237 ft [1901 m], Spanish Fork quad, in Utah County, National Elevation Dataset 40.0041215°N 111.7213179°W)
- USGS peak Mollies Nipple (7264 ft [2214 m], Deer Range Point quad, in Kane County, National Elevation Dataset 37.2708155°N 112.0551854°W)
- USGS peak Mollies Nipple (7769 ft [2368 m], Two Tom Hill quad, in Utah County, National Elevation Dataset 40.152179°N 111.3737919°W)
- USGS peak Mollys Nipple (5328 ft [1624 m], Antelope Island South quad, in Davis County, NAD27 40.8749431°N 112.188002°W)
- USGS peak Mollies Nipple (4593 ft [1400 m], Hurricane, Washington County, National Elevation Dataset 37.1283164°N 113.2980041°W)
- USGS peak Mollys Nipple (4865 ft [1483 m], Ouray SE, Uintah County, National Elevation Dataset 40.0569088°N 109.5706898°W)

== Notable Mollie's Nipples ==
=== Kane County ===
Mollies Nipple, a mountain summit at the head of Kitchen Canyon in Grand Staircase–Escalante National Monument, Kane County, is the second highest feature so named, reaching 7,264 feet (2,214.07 meters) above sea level. The climb has areas of a few classes including Class 2 and Class 3 and a short "50 foot (15.24 m) Class 4 Pitch". The trail-head can be approached only by a four-wheel drive.

This peak is "standing alone in a land of mesas", and is easily seen from a distance between "cliffs and canyons".

=== Bear River Gorge ===
Molly's Nipple rocky knob at Bear River Gorge is notable because an outlaw known by multiple names including "Black Jack Nelson" used to hide his stolen treasures at that place.

=== Hurricane Valley ===
Mollie's Nipple butte is located in Hurricane Valley Heritage Park. Its elevation is 1,353 feet (412 m) "above the fertile Hurricane Valley". Mollie's Nipple butte was well known to pioneers during frontier exploration of the area. The butte has an archeological significance because indigenous peoples of the Americas used the caves below the Nipple for cooking. Climbers also find some old pottery atop of the Nipple. It is believed that the butte was used "to send up smoke signals to hunting and seed gathering parties."

The butte can be climbed with those who reach the top are rewarded by what is said to be "a vast circle of breath-taking, colorful, geologic and historic wonders, unmatched by any view in the world!"
