= Paps of Lothian =

The Paps of Lothian are two hills in Scotland:

- Arthur's Seat
- North Berwick Law

== See also ==
- Paps (disambiguation)
