= Paps of Anu =

Pair of mountains in County Kerry, Ireland

- Dá Chích Anann
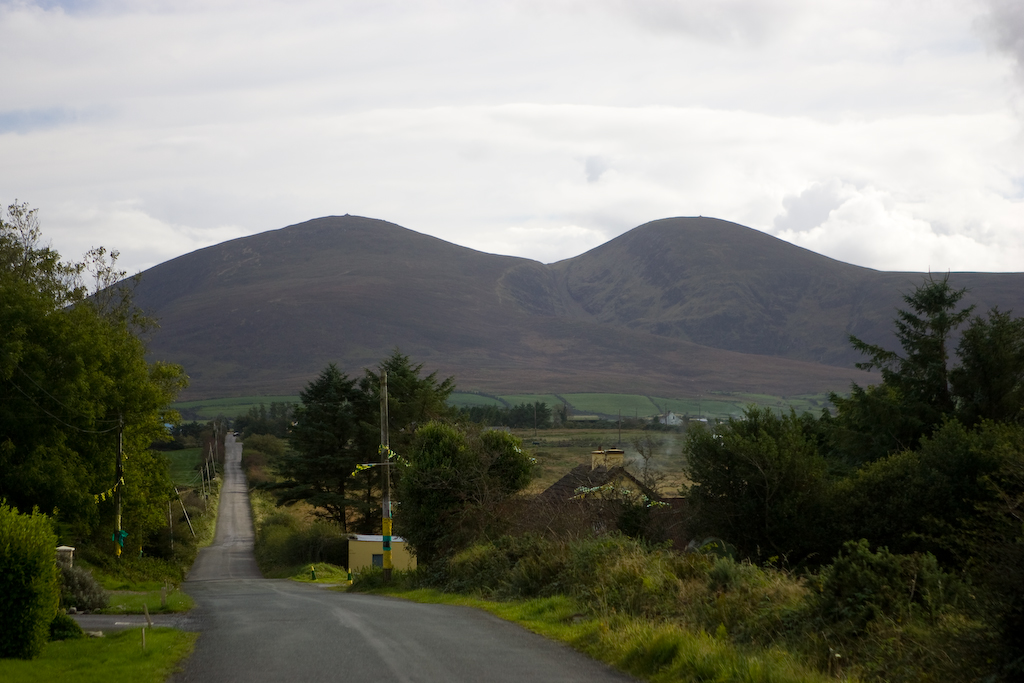

Highest point
- Elevation: 694 m (2,277 ft)
- Listing: Breast-shaped hills
- Coordinates: 52°00′55″N 9°16′09″W

Geography
- Location within Ireland
- Location: County Kerry, Ireland

Climbing
- Easiest route: From Rathmore, County Kerry

The Paps of Anu (Irish: Dá Chích Anann, "the breasts of Anu") are a pair of breast-shaped mountains near Killarney in County Kerry, Ireland. They are the highest peaks of Derrynasaggart Mountains. The eastern summit, The Paps East, is 694 metres (2,277 ft) high and the western top, The Paps West is 690 metres (2,260 ft) high.

Anu is believed to be an ancient mother goddess. Cormac's Glossary describes Anu or Danu as "the mother of the gods of Ireland". On each summit is a prehistoric cairn, which may be miniature passage graves or house burial cists reaching back to 2,500 BC. The cairn on the eastern Pap is slightly larger, with a height of 4 metres (13 ft) and diameter of 16 metres (52 ft). They have been described as "stone nipples on the great breasts of the mother goddess". A line of stones, known as Na Fiacla, connects the two tops and is believed to have been a processional route. Archeologist Frank Coyne suggested that the mountains were seen as sacred and said "There is little doubt that the mountaintops of both The Paps…were utilized for ritual in prehistory". To the ancients, the mountains reinforced the idea that the Earth was a motherly body.

There is a stream running between the mountains. One half flows north into a small lake called Lough Nageeha and the other half flows south into the Clydagh River.

In wintertime, there are charity walks organized around the time of the winter solstice, with large groups participating and food, drinks and entertainment provided.

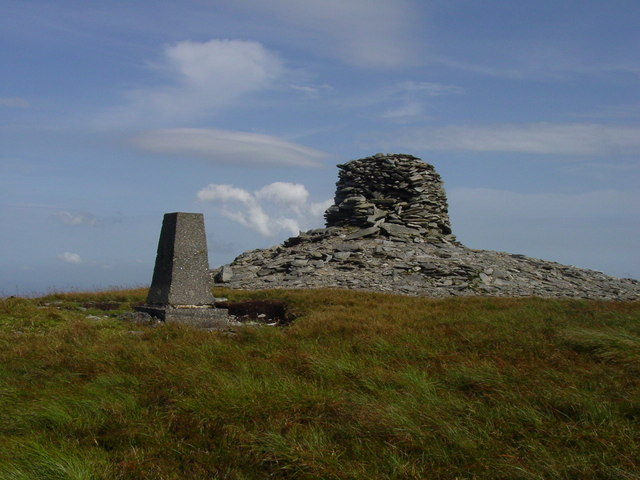
The cairn and trig pillar on top of the western Pap

== Cahercrovdarrig ==
To the northeast of the peaks is an ancient circular stone enclosure called Cahercrovdarrig (Cathair Crobh Dearg, 'Red Claw Fort/City') or 'The City'. The Paps can be clearly seen from Cahercrovdarrig and it appears that the two sites are linked. Additionally it is believed the nipple-shaped cairns on the Paps were deliberately placed slightly off-crest to the north to enhance the breasts-like shape as viewed from Cahercrovdarrig. "The City" contains a possible ruined megalithic tomb, an ogham stone, an earthen mound, a holy well, and a cross-inscribed stone altar. When the water table is high enough, the water "noisily bubbles up from its depths".

It is believed that Cahercrovdarrig has been a site of religious rituals for as long as 3800 years. The site is believed to be named after Crobh Dearg, and was originally used for Beltane rituals and festivities. Over time, the site and the festivities became somewhat Christianized. A yearly May Day festival was held there up until World War II. According to local folklorist Dan Cronin, the festival involved music, dancing, drinking, and "champions…performing feats of valour". People would circle the well and the other features of the site while reciting prayers. They would also walk their cattle around the well as a purification ritual. In 1925, the festivities "were augmented…for the first time in modern memory, with the inclusion of a Mass". In his sermon, the priest commented that "The pagan danger is now past. Paganism is dead, or rather all the best elements in it have been absorbed into Christianity". After World War II, "all that remained of the event were the penitential rites, observed by the occasional visitor on any day of the year, and by a small crowd celebrating Mass there each May Day". A statue of Mary has been erected at the site. In 1983, a local affiliate of Comhaltas Ceoltóirí Éireann, the Irish cultural organization, working with the parish priest, reintroduced music and dance to the May Day festival at Cahercrovdarrig.

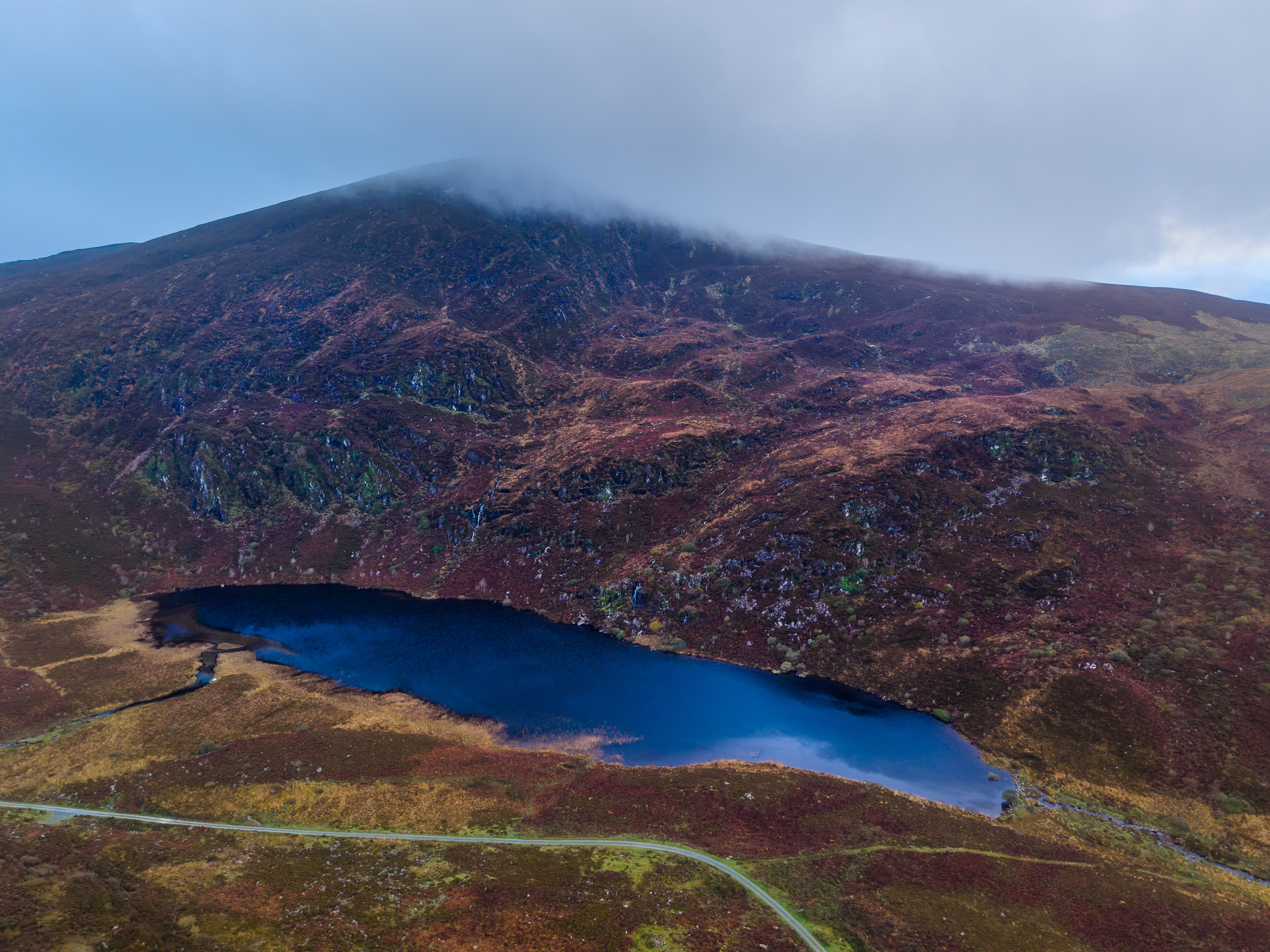
Lough Glannafreaghaun, also known as Shrone Lake, in Slyggudal Pass. The Paps East is visible in distance.

== Slyggudal Pass ==
On the east side of the Paps, there is a pass cutting north-south through the Derrynasaggart mountains, linking Rathmore and Clonkeen areas. It is called Slyggudal Pass and it runs along the Glannafreaghaun Lough (also known as the Shrone Lake). According to some accounts, before the current narrow road was built in the late 60s, the pass was locally called as the "Old Bridle Path". The section of the road from the north side to the Glannafreaghaun lake was declared public road in 1974. As of 2025, the pass is not fit for normal car traffic; it is a narrow gravel road, and there are cattle gates placed across in several places. The Glannafreaghaun lake itself is one of the water supply sources for Kerry East.

== See also ==
- List of mountains in Ireland
- Maiden Paps
