= High Wheeldon =

Hill in Derbyshire, England

Coordinates: 53.19100°N 1.85179°W

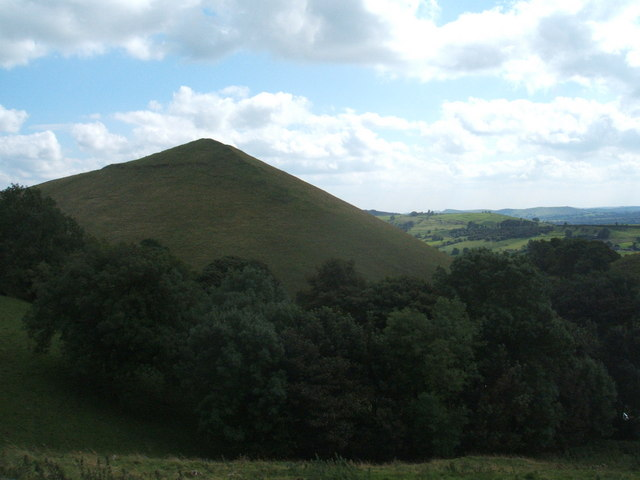

Highest point
- Elevation: c. 422 m (c. 1387 ft)

Geography
- Location: Hartington Middle Quarter civil parish, Derbyshire, Peak District, England
- OS grid: SK1066
- Topo map: OS Landranger 119

High Wheeldon is a dome-shaped hill near the Staffordshire border in Hartington Middle Quarter civil parish, Derbyshire, in the Peak District valley of Upper Dovedale, overlooking the villages of Earl Sterndale, Longnor and Crowdecote. It is close to Chrome Hill and Parkhouse Hill. High Wheeldon has been in the care of the National Trust since 1946 when it was donated by the owner to the Trust as a war memorial. A plaque at the summit says that the hill was presented 'in honoured memory of the men of Derbyshire and Staffordshire who fell in the Second World War'.

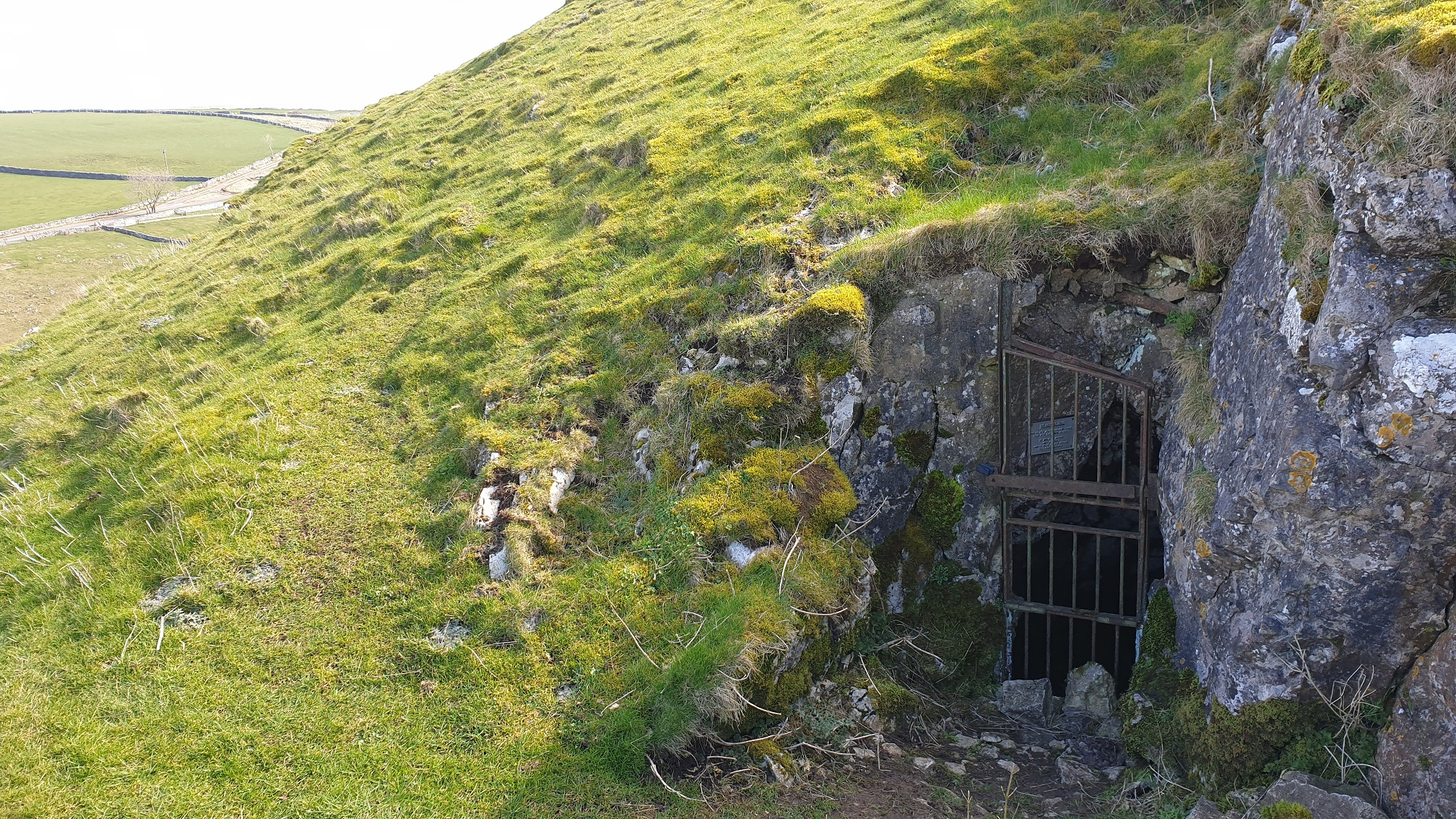
Entrance to Fox Hole Cave

Slightly below the summit of the hill is a rock shelter called Fox Hole Cave, which is closed by an iron gate as it has archaeological significance. Items, including Peterborough ware, early Bronze Age pottery, a stone axe, flint microliths and animal bones, have been found in the cave, which is believed to have been used from the Upper Paleolithic. The cave is a scheduled monument.
