= Crowdecote =

Coordinates: 53.184°N 1.849°W

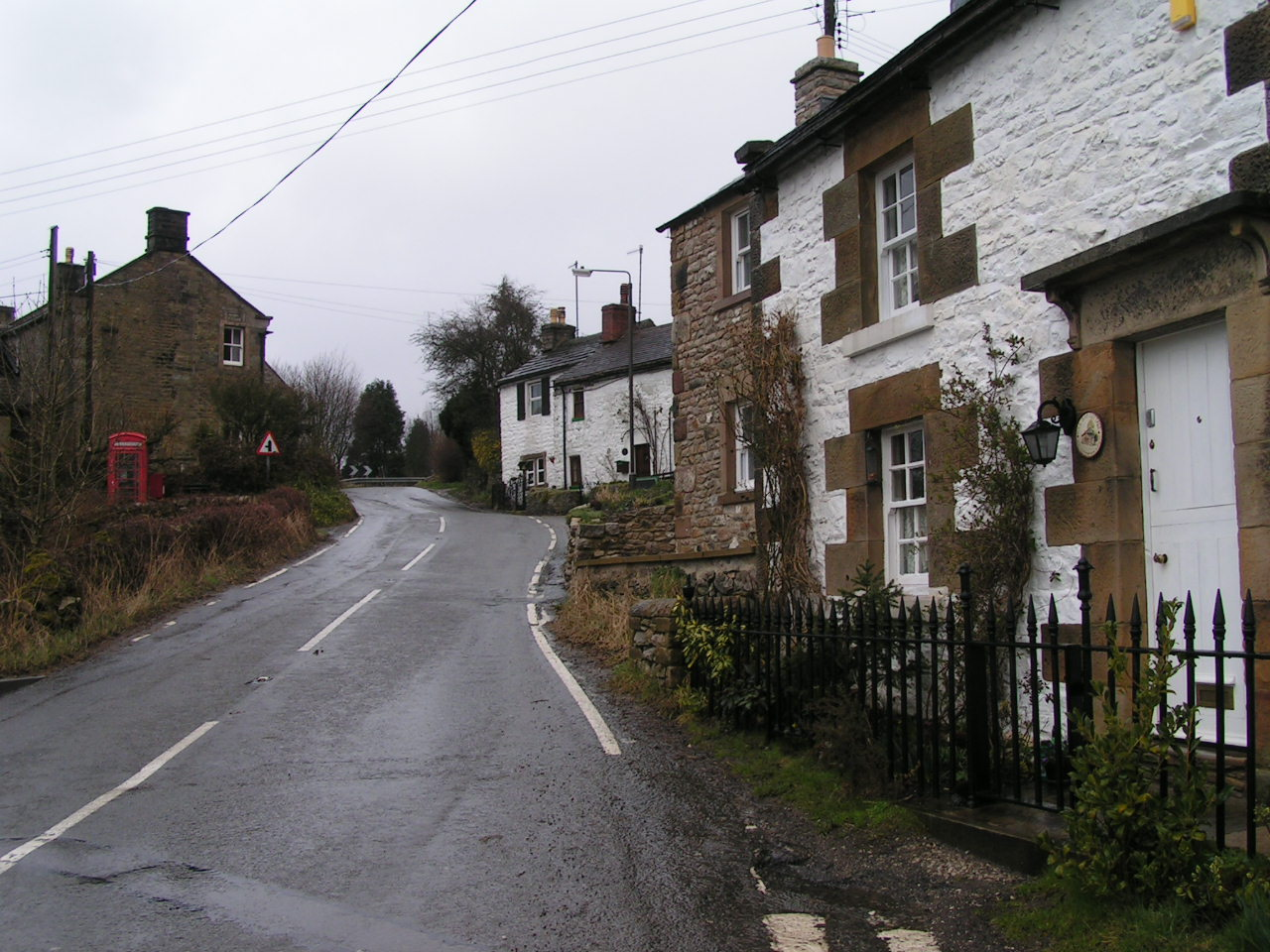

- Location within Derbyshire
- OS grid reference: SK100651
- Civil parish: Hartington Middle Quarter
- District: Derbyshire Dales
- Shire county: Derbyshire
- Region: East Midlands
- Country: England
- Sovereign state: United Kingdom
- Post town: BUXTON
- Postcode district: SK17
- Police: Derbyshire
- Fire: Derbyshire
- Ambulance: East Midlands

Crowdecote (sometimes spelled Crowdicote) is a small village in Derbyshire, England. It is situated on the border between Derbyshire and Staffordshire about 6 miles (9.7 km) south of Buxton. Crowdecote is within the civil parish of Hartington Middle Quarter. It is thought that the name Crowdecote derives from Cruda’s Cot (Cruda was a Saxon landowner while 'cot' meant a form of shelter). Crowdecote is popular with walkers and ramblers because of its proximity to Chrome Hill, High Wheeldon and Parkhouse Hill to the north and Dovedale to the south.

== See also ==
- Listed buildings in Hartington Middle Quarter
