= Sterndale =

Sterndale may refer to:

== People ==
- Robert Armitage Sterndale (1839–1902), British naturalist and statesman
- Joan Sterndale-Bennett (1914–1996), British stage and film actress
- Sir William Sterndale Bennett (1816–1875), English composer
- William Pickford, 1st Baron Sterndale (1848–1923), British lawyer and judge
- Dr Leon Sterndale, a fictional character in The Adventure of the Devil's Foot, a Sherlock Holmes story by Sir Arthur Conan Doyle

== Places ==
- Earl Sterndale, a village in Derbyshire, England
- King Sterndale, a village in Derbyshire, England
