= Double sunset =

Sun setting twice as a result of local geographical features

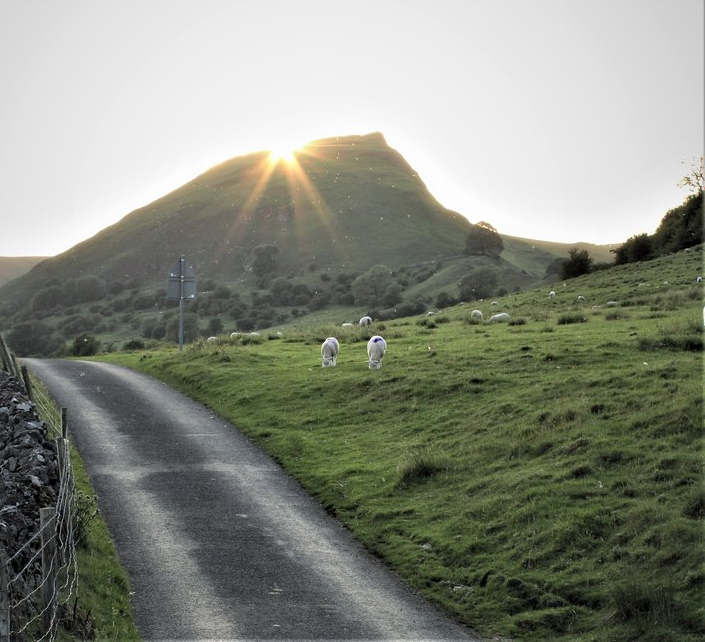
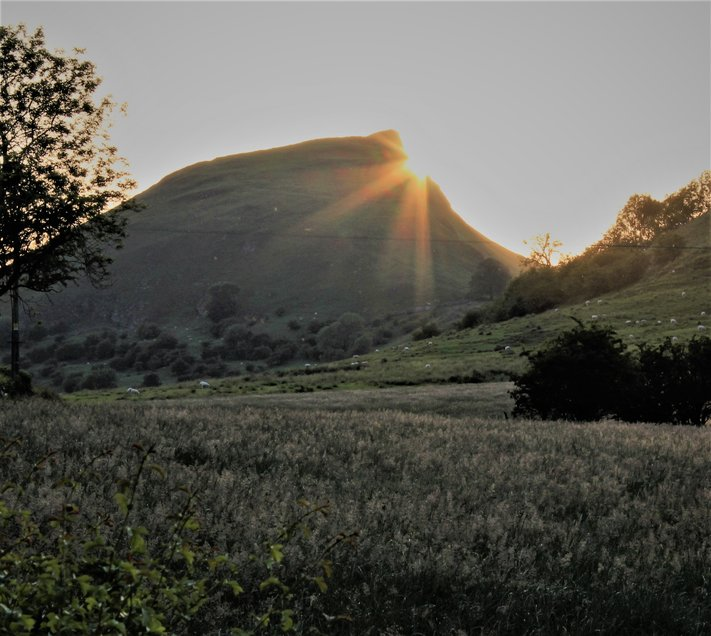
Midsummer double sunset at Chrome Hill in Derbyshire, England. The Sun sets behind the hill (left) before re-emerging (right) to set again in the valley.

A double sunset is a rare astro-geographical phenomenon, in which the Sun appears to set twice in the same evening from a specific viewing-point. A double sunrise may also occur in a similar situation. Such phenomena may have been regarded as significant in prehistoric times, and double sunsets have been discussed in the context of archaeoastronomy by researchers such as Alexander Thom. The different meanings of "double sunset" refer to the solar eclipse, when the most significant phase is observed shortly before or after the geometrical sunset. In turn, an observer might see two moments with the same level of illumination, adequate to typical sunset or twilight conditions. The phenomenon is alternatively called "double sunrise" or "double dusk", "double dawn" and was reported in Shaanxi Province on April 21, 899 BC following morning annular solar eclipse

== Italy ==
Orasso, a small village near the Italy-Switzerland border, sees two sunrises and two sunsets during the winter because of Mount Riga.

== Spain ==
In the town of Güímar in Tenerife a double sunset has been observed in alignment with the local pyramids at summer solstice. In Spanish the phenomenon is described as a doble puesta. The site of the pyramids appears to have been used by the Guanche prehispanic culture, but the structures themselves have been dated to the 19th century.

== United Kingdom ==
=== England ===
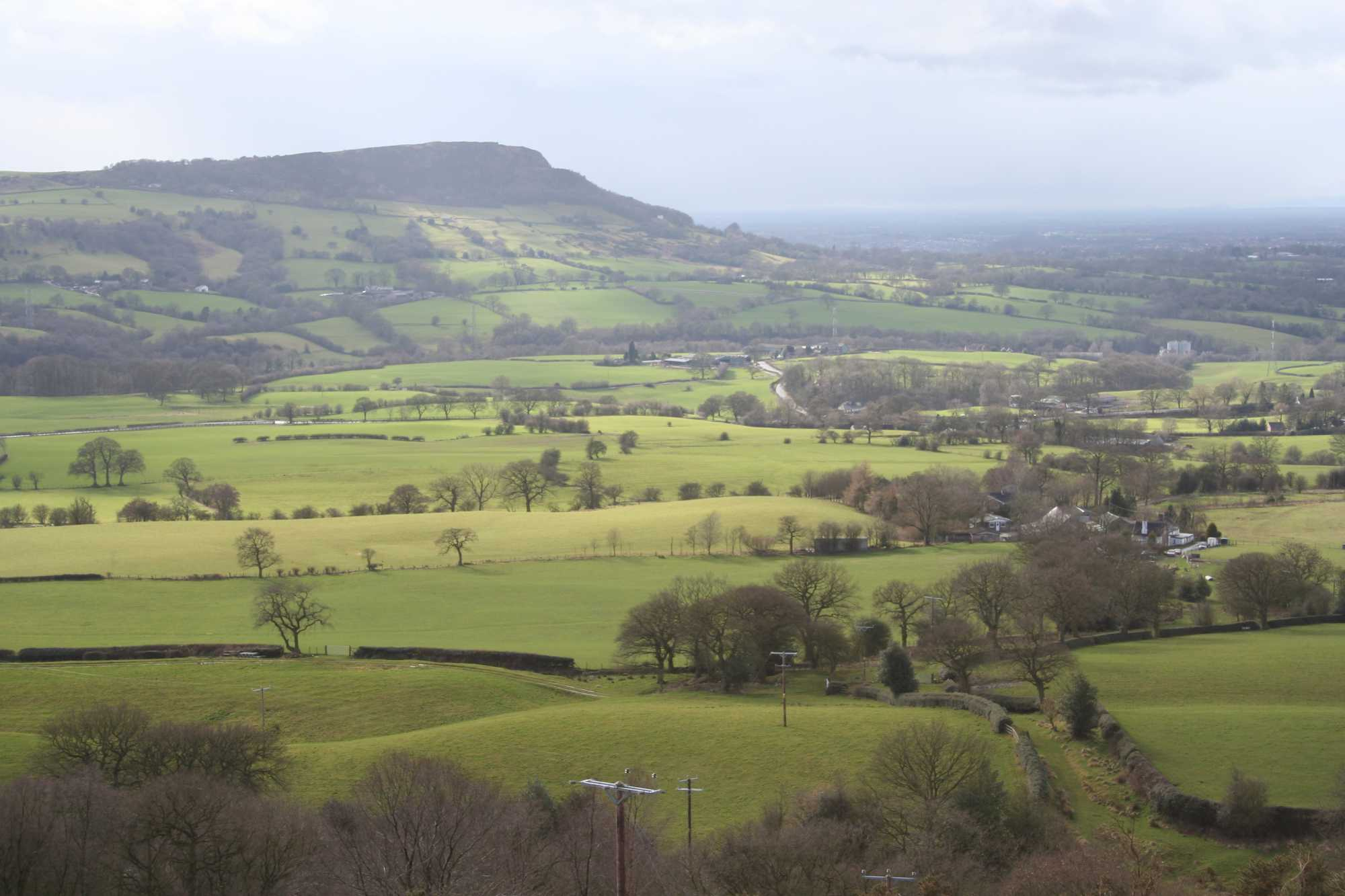
Bosley Cloud

==== Staffordshire ====
A well-documented example of a double or occulted sunset is associated with Leek, Staffordshire, England. The phenomenon is viewable from the town on and around the summer solstice in good weather.

The first published mention of the Leek double sunset was made in 1686 by Dr Robert Plot in his book The Natural History Of Stafford-Shire. The phenomenon would have been visible well before the seventeenth century. However, the alignment of sun and landscape is subject to change over the centuries as it is affected by the Earth's axial precession. This was realised by Plot who suggested that the sunset could be used to measure the obliquity of the ecliptic. (Note: A shortened version of Kilburn's article can be accessed at Dr. Plot and the Amazing Double Sunset.)

The traditional location for observing the phenomenon, as described by Plot, is the churchyard belonging to the parish church of St Edward the Confessor. The church is a medieval building, and it has been conjectured that the churchyard is an example of an ancient sacred site having been Christianised. Because of the chronology of the changing alignment, it seems that the site could not have been a viewing-point for the double sunset before the Iron Age. The first people to view the phenomenon may have been the area's Iron Age inhabitants.

From a particular point in the churchyard, the whole of the Sun set on the summit of Bosley Cloud, a millstone grit hill six miles to the northwest. The Sun partially reappeared from The Cloud's steep northern slope and soon afterwards set for a second and final time on the horizon. The spectacle was last reliably witnessed, and filmed, from the churchyard in 1977, but is no longer visible from the location because of the presence of trees. It is, however, still observable from Leek on and around the summer solstice from the road to Pickwood Hall, off Milltown Way, and from Lowe Hill on the outskirts of the town. Better viewing points, though, are from the A 523, above Rudyard Lake, and Woodhouse Green, both of which are nearer to The Cloud and therefore enable a larger proportion of the sun to reappear.

==== Derbyshire ====
- Thorpe Cloud. Viewed from the top of nearby Lin Dale on and around the summer solstice and perhaps beyond. The Sun sets on the summit of the hill, partially reappears from its steep northern slope and sets for a second and final time shortly afterwards.

=== Scotland ===
In the 1950s Alexander Thom surveyed a megalithic site at Kintraw, a locality on the mainland of Scotland, which is in an area rich in prehistoric sites. Thom interpreted the site at Kintraw as a viewing point of a double sunset on the island of Jura (both the island and the mainland site are in Argyll and Bute). The proposed alignment is to a notch at a distance of 28 miles between the mountains of Beinn Shiantaidh and Beinn a' Chaolais which are visible from Kintraw.

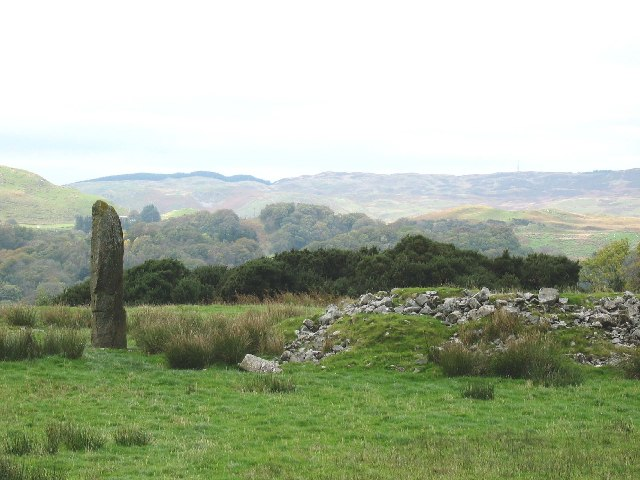
The 4 metre high standing stone at Kintraw.

Thom described the site as a type of midwinter observatory, but his interpretation has been the subject of controversy, one point at issue being the visibility of the midwinter notch: a higher observation point is needed to see the midwinter notch on Jura over a nearby ridge. Euan MacKie, recognising that Thom's theories needed to be tested, excavated at the site in 1970 and 1971, and found evidence for an observation platform.

== Notes and references ==
Notes

Bibliography

- Kent, Jeff (2001), The Mysterious Double Sunset, Stafford: Witan Books, ISBN 978-0-952-91525-6
