= Beinn an Òir =

Highest peak of the Paps of Jura on the island of Jura, Scotland

Coordinates: 55.90198°N 6.00423°W

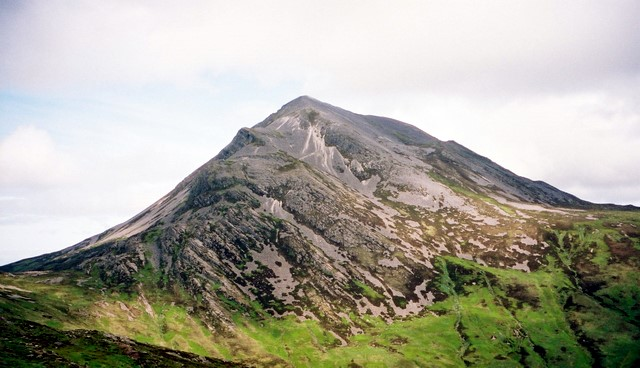
- The south face of Beinn an Òir

Highest point
- Elevation: 785 m (2,575 ft)
- Prominence: 785 m (2,575 ft)Ranked 39th in British Isles
- Parent peak: none - HP Jura
- Listing: Marilyn, Corbett, Hardy

Naming
- English translation: mountain of gold
- Language of name: Gaelic
- Pronunciation: Scottish Gaelic: [ˈpeiɲ ən̪ˠ ˈɔːɾʲ]

Geography
- Location within Scotland
- Location: Jura, Scotland
- Parent range: Paps of Jura
- OS grid: NR498749
- Topo map: OS Landrangers 60, 61

Beinn an Òir (Gaelic for "mountain of gold") is the highest peak of the Paps of Jura on the island of Jura, Scotland. It is the highest peak on the island, standing at 785 metres, and is thereby a Corbett.

Beinn an Òir is frequently climbed along with the other two peaks forming the Paps: Beinn Shiantaidh and Beinn a' Chaolais. The most usual route for this ascent starts from the bridge over the Corran River, and Beinn an Òir is invariably the second peak to be climbed, regardless of which order of peaks is chosen for the route. Alternatively, it is possible to avoid the other two peaks and climb Beinn an Òir from either of the bealachs that separate it from its neighbours.
