= Inver Hydro-Electric Scheme =

Power station on Jura, Inner Hebrides, Scotland

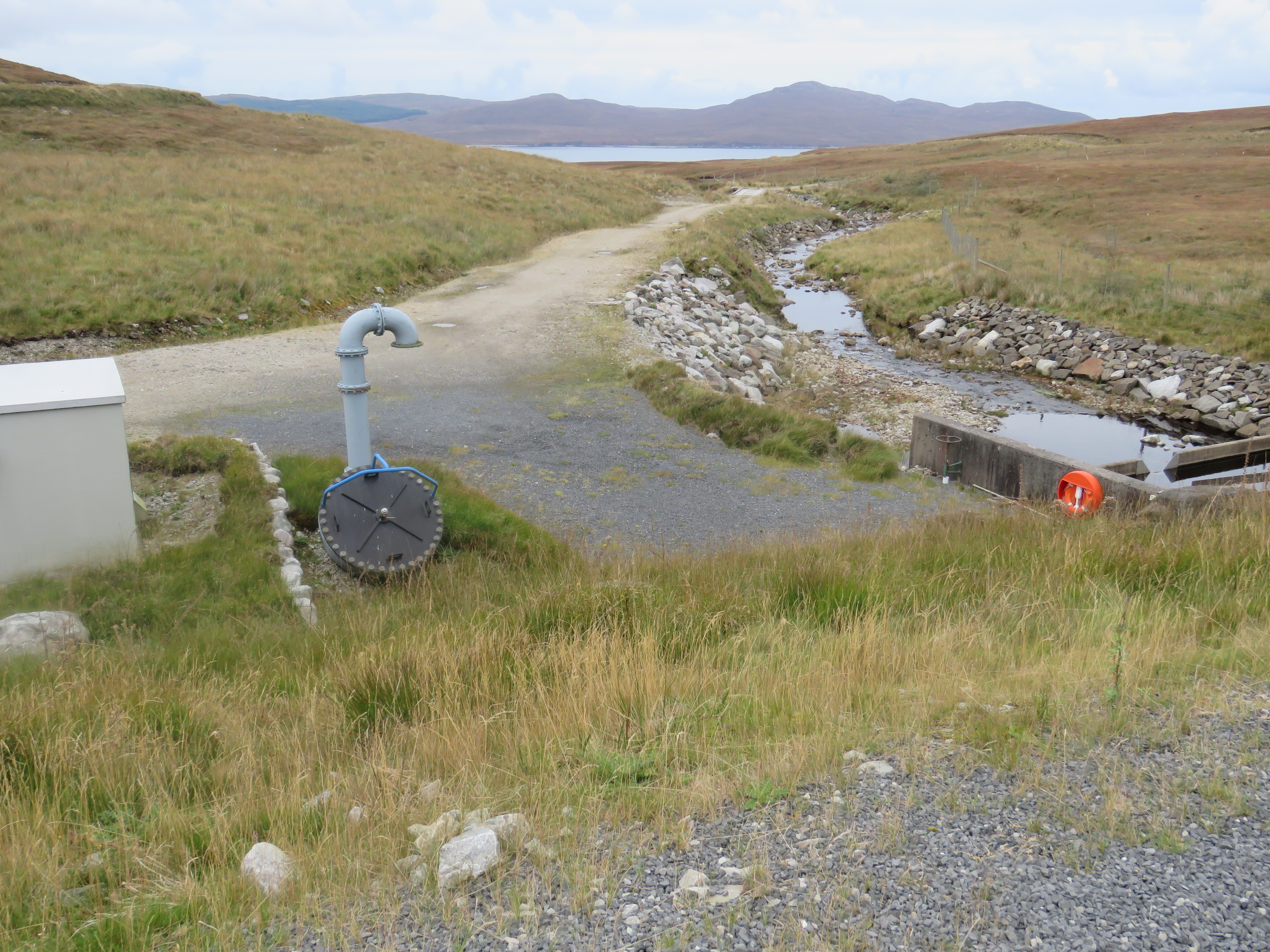
- An inspection hatch for the pipeline and the Abhainn a' Chnuic Bhric

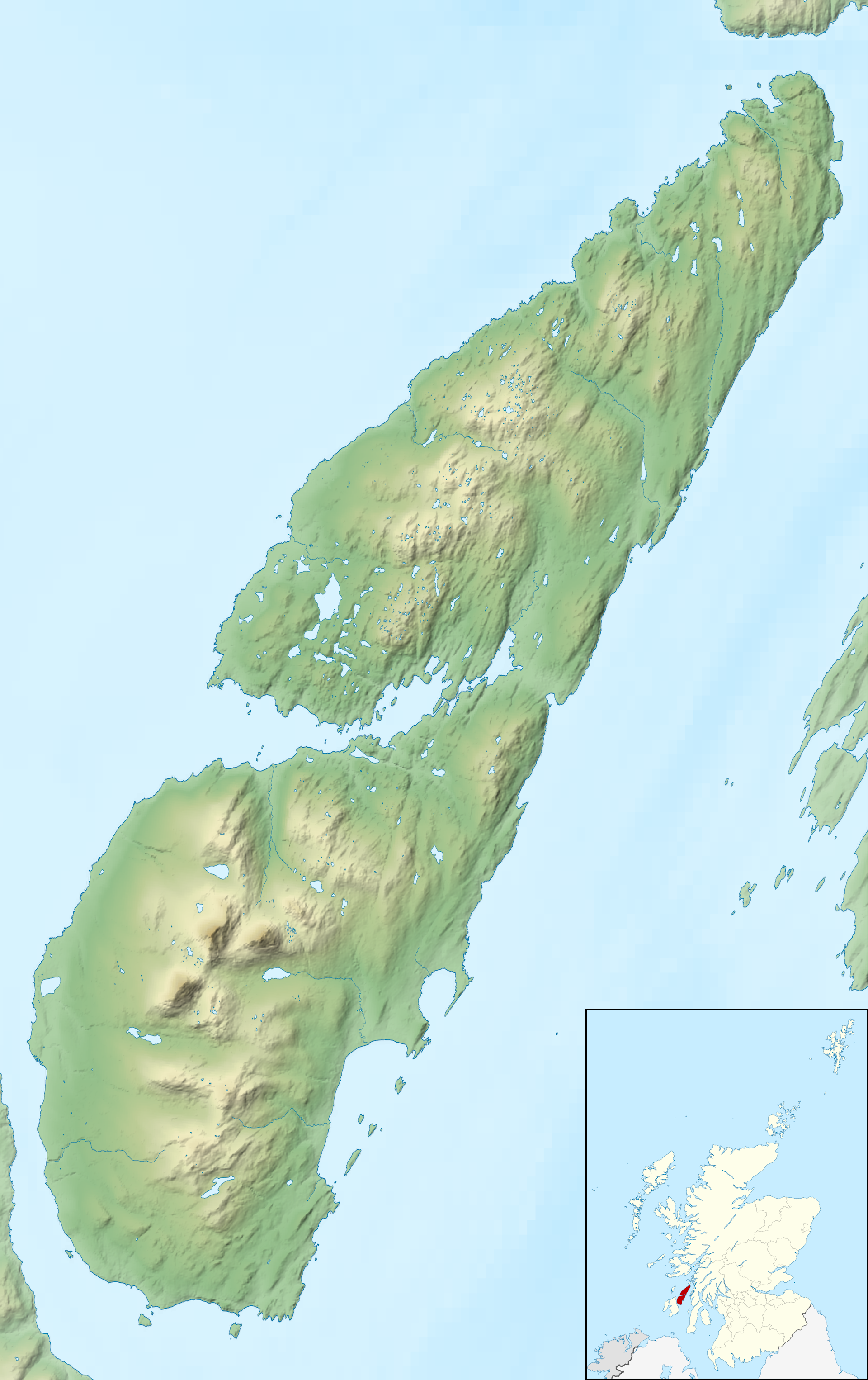
- Location within Jura
- Interactive map of Inver; Hydro-Electric Scheme
- Country: Scotland
- Location: Jura
- Coordinates: 55.8717°N 6.0837°W
- Purpose: Power
- Status: Operational
- Opening date: 2012
- Owner: Inver Hydro LLC

Inver Hydro-Electric Scheme is a remote hydro-electric plant on the Scottish island of Jura, part of the Inner Hebrides. Construction began in 2011, and it was operational by June 2012. It is the third scheme built on the Inver Estate, but the first to be connected to the National Grid. It can produce 2 MW of electric power.

During the winter of 2019/2020, it ran at capacity for over three months, when a fault developed on the undersea cable that connects Jura to the mainland, and supplies the islands of Islay and Colonsay. The scheme was used as part of a constraint management zone, using renewable energy rather than diesel generators to maintain supplies to the three islands. The emergency lasted from 20 November 2019 until late Match 2020, when calmer weather allowed a new cable to be laid across the Sound of Jura. During this period, the station produced some 5 GWh of energy.

== History ==
The Inver Estate lies on the west coast of Jura, to the north of the Feolin ferry slipway. Inver Cottage lies around 1.2 miles (1.9 km) to the north of the slipway. The cottage was first supplied with electricity in the 1960s, when a waterwheel was installed nearby, to drive a direct-current generator. This scheme lasted until the early 1980s, when it was replaced by a small hydro-electric plant, rated at 30 kW. This had sufficient capacity to power Feolin Ferry House and streetlights close to the ferry slipway. The slipway is a category B listed structure, and was originally built around 1810. Thomas Telford managed the project, acting for the Parliamentary Commissioners for Highland Roads and Bridges, while James Hollingworth was the engineer. The Ferry House is also listed and is attributed to Telford.

The generator gave good service for over 30 years, but there was a need for additional energy, and the decision was taken to install a much larger hydro-electric system, and connect it to the National Grid, so that spare power could be exported. The site of the scheme is environmentally sensitive, as it is located within the Jura National Scenic Area, and Optimised Environments were commissioned to make a landscape and visual assessment for the scheme. Planning permission was obtained in July 2010, but the details were altered, and a second assessment to account for the changes was produced in December 2010. Construction work began in the spring of 2011.

The storage reservoir for the scheme was created by constructing a dam across the outlet of Lochan Gleann Astaile, on the southern slopes of the Paps of Jura, to raise the level of the loch by 10 feet (3 m). The dam is 920 feet (280 m) long and impounds some 700 megalitres (Ml) of water. From the dam, 2,700 yards (2,500 m) of underground pipeline carry the water to the turbines. The polyethylene pipe is 47 inches (1,200 mm) in diameter, and is suitable for the static head of 430 feet (130 m) created by the drop in level from the dam to the turbines. The whole system is designed to last at least 50 years with minimal maintenance.

In common with most of the schemes developed by the North of Scotland Hydro-Electric Board in the 1950s and 1960s, the catchment of the reservoir was increased by capturing the headwaters of three other streams. The Southern Ditch intercepts the Abhainn Gleann Iubharnadail, on the border of the Inver and Ardfin estates. A short underground section is followed by an open aqueduct, which is crossed by two pedestrian bridges and four bridges suitable for all-terrain vehicles. The Northern Ditch runs from the Allt an t-Sluic Bhrodaich, and also consists of a short underground section and a long open aqueduct, which is crossed by three pedestrian bridges and two all-terrain vehicle bridges. The Northern Ditch Extension joins the Northern Ditch, carrying water from the Allt Blar Buidhe an t-Sluic Bhrodaich. Concrete weirs were constructed at each of the intake points, to direct water into the ditches. Below the intake points, the two northern rivers combine to form the Allt Bun an Eas, before discharging into the Sound of Islay.

The scheme was developed by a partnership between Inver Farmers and Lithgows, the Glasgow shipbuilders, with generation of electricity beginning in June 2012, although work continued on the project until December. The powerhouse from the 1980s scheme was relocated next to the new powerhouse, and is operated during periods of low rainfall. The new building contains two Francis turbines, rated at 1 MW each, and the reservoir stores enough water to power the turbines for ten days.

=== Electricity connection ===
Jura is connected to the National Grid by a transmission line from Lochgilphead which runs to Tayvallich and then crosses the Sound of Jura by an undersea cable. On Jura, the transmission line continues down the east coast and along the southern coast. Another undersea cable runs from just north of the tiny island of Glas Eilean on Jura to Traigh Bhan on Islay. A third undersea cable runs from the north-east corner of Islay near the Ruvaal Lighthouse to supply the island of Colonsay. In order to benefit from the feed-in tariffs available to producers of green energy, over 4 miles (6.4 km) of 33kV underground cable were used to connect the turbines to the grid near Ardfin, with surplus energy being sold to the grid.

=== Operation ===
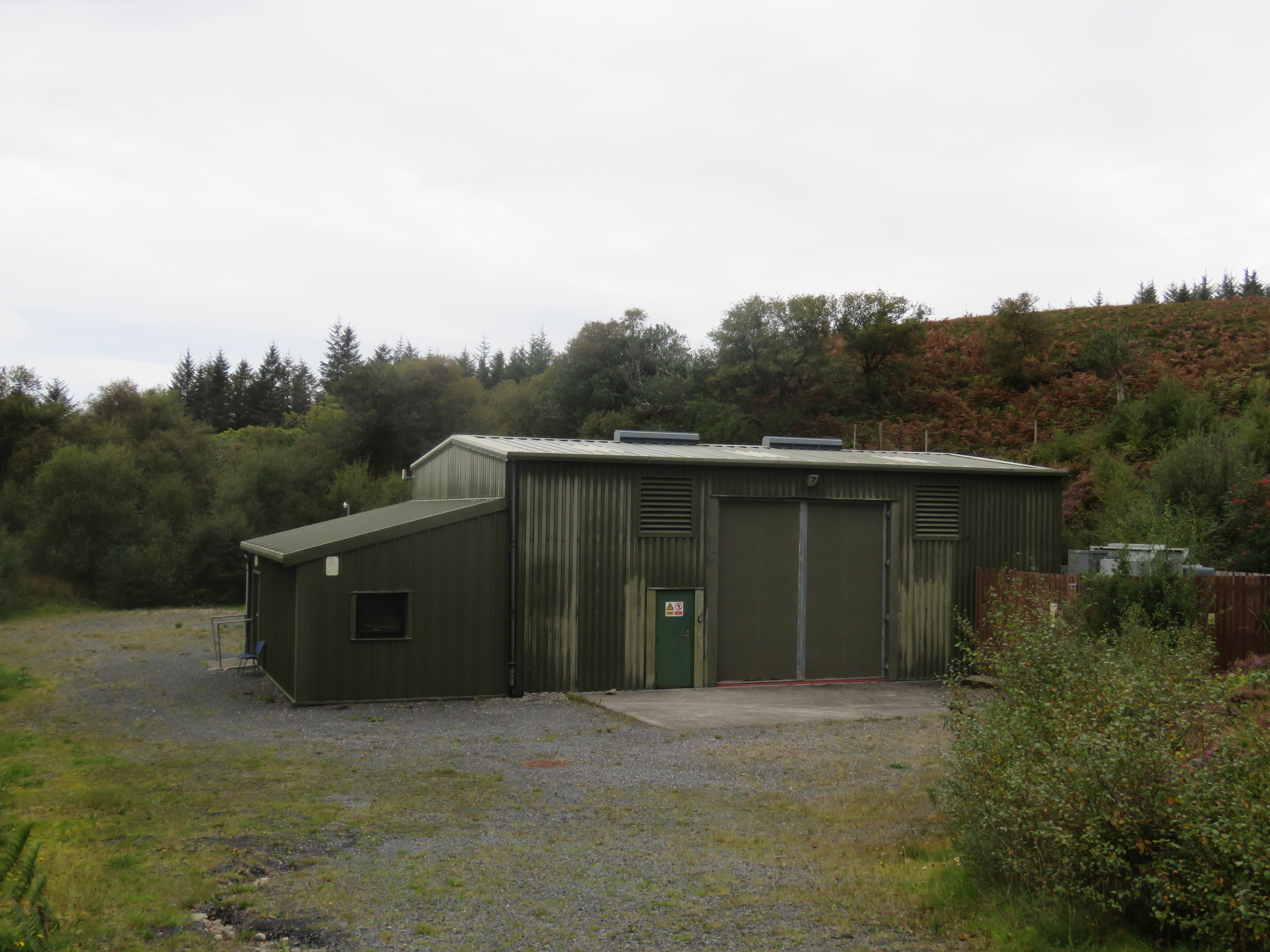
The turbines are housed in an unremarkable building, while the 1980s scheme turbine house is located behind this structure.

On 20 November 2019, a fault occurred on the undersea cable from Tayvallich to Jura, and Scottish and Southern Electricity Networks (SSEN) implemented a constraint management zone to ensure the consumers on Jura, Islay and Colonsay continued to have an electricity supply. Constraint management zones are a method of managing faults and power outages by the use of renewable resources, rather than resorting to temporary diesel generators. Inver hydro-electric scheme was a major part of this, running at full capacity for several months, and producing around 40 per cent of the total requirements for all three islands. The remainder was generated by black starting Bowmore diesel power station on Islay. The Inver scheme supplied 5 GWh of energy over a four-month period, saving customers around £230,000, compared with using diesel generators, and avoiding the production of some 2,450 tonnes of carbon dioxide, which they would have produced.

The Bowmore station was originally built by the Royal Air Force after the Second World War, and was acquired by the North of Scotland Hydro-Electric Board in 1949. It was expanded, and now has a capacity of 6 MW, but since the National Grid reached the islands in 1962, it has only been used as a backup.

SSEN decided to replace the entire undersea cable, and received a marine licence allowing them to proceed on 24 January 2020. A cable laying ship arrived in the Sound of Jura soon afterwards, but severe weather conditions prevented it from laying the cable. The weather also caused a number of faults to the electricity network on the islands, causing the power station to trip out on several occasions. The ship remained in the area, and calmer weather finally came in late March. The cable was laid on 25 March, and the connection to the National Grid was reinstated on 31 March.

Since 2017, Inver Hydro have been in dispute with the rating authority over the level of business rates charged. When the business was set up in 2010, rates were £104,000 per year. Despite the fact that the basis on which such rates are calculated has not changed, they were increased to £264,000 in 2017, and to £565,000 in 2023. Such increases have been applied to many of the smaller hydro-electric schemes in Scotland, although some have seen a similar level of reduction, with the rates for one scheme dropping from £74,000 to just £14,000. The rates for the Inver scheme are now more than those for two neighbouring wind farms combined, which between them can generate 16 MW. The company appealed against the increase in 2017, and are one of over 200 similar businesses that had outstanding appeals in 2022.

== Hydrology ==
The reservoir for the scheme is Lochan Gleann Astaile. This has a surface area of 52 acres (21 ha), the surface is 440 feet (134 m) above ordnance datum (AOD), and its catchment area is 3.48 square miles (9.01 km^{2}). It is fed by the Abhainn Gleann Astaile and a network of tributaries which drain the southern foothills of the Paps of Jura. The Abhainn Gleann Iubharnadail drains the slopes of two smaller hills, the Glas Bheinn and Dubh Bheinn. A weir just above a waterfall supplies the Southern Ditch. The Allt an t-Sluic Bhrodaich, which feeds the Northern Ditch, drains three small lochs located on a saddle between two of the Paps, Bheinn a' Chaolais to the south and Bheinn an Oir to the north. The Allt Blar Buidhe an t-Sluic Bhrodaich, which feeds the Northern Ditch Extension, drains the western foothills of Bheinn an Oir.

A small amount of compensation water is released from the dam to feed the Abhainn a' Chnuic Bhric, which flows to the northwest and empties into Loch a' Chnuic Bhric. This has a surface area of 64 acres (26 ha), is located at 52 feet (16 m) AOD, and drains a catchment of 5.27 square miles (13.65 km^{2}). From its outlet, the Abhainn na h-Uanaire flows southwards, parallel to the coast, and its flow is swelled by the tailrace from the hydro-electric station just before it flows into the Abhainn Gleann Iubharnadail. Below the confluence are two weirs. A conduit from the first weir runs parallel to the river, and probably drove the 1960s waterwheel. The river is tidal below the second weir, and enters the Sound of Islay soon afterwards.

== Bibliography ==
- Advertiser (17 April 2020). "Hydro power station helps keep islands connected". Argyllshire Advertiser. Archived from the original on 4 October 2023.
- Aliaxis (2022). "GPS PE Black supports one of the most remote private hydro schemes in the UK". Aliaxis UK. Archived from the original on 3 July 2022.
- Baker, Lisa (12 December 2022). "Scottish hydro schemes hit by new business rates boorach". Business in the News. Archived from the original on 12 December 2022.
- Gardiner & Theobald (2012). "Inver Hydro Dam". Gardiner & Theobald. Archived from the original on 4 October 2023.
- Lempriere, Molly (8 April 2020). "SSEN hits 'important milestone' using CMZ to manage the grid". Current News. Archived from the original on 4 October 2023.
- OPEN (2012). "Inver Hydro". Optimised Environments. Archived from the original on 8 August 2020.
- SSEN (August 2020). "Jura — Tayvallich submarine cable" (PDF). Scottish and Southern Electricity Networks. Archived (PDF) from the original on 4 October 2023.
- Whitlock, Robin (12 December 2022). "Dozens of Small Hydro schemes to be hit by new increases in Scottish business rates". Renewable Energy Magazine. Archived from the original on 22 December 2022.
- Williamson, Mark (5 October 2012). "Shipbuilder refocuses on renewables". The Herald. Archived from the original on 3 October 2023.
