= Listed buildings in Hartington Middle Quarter =

Hartington Middle Quarter is a civil parish in the Derbyshire Dales district of Derbyshire, England. The parish contains 15 listed buildings that are recorded in the National Heritage List for England. All the listed buildings are designated at Grade II, the lowest of the three grades, which is applied to "buildings of national importance and special interest". The parish, which is to the north of the village of Hartington, is almost entirely rural, the main settlements being the villages of Earl Sterndale and Crowdecote. Most of the listed buildings are houses, cottages, farmhouses and associated structures, and the other listed buildings are a church, a school, a bridge, and a milepost.

== Buildings ==
| Name and location | Photograph | Date | Notes |
|---|---|---|---|
| Hurdlow Hall, wall and gates 53.19730°N 1.82505°W | | 1689 | The farmhouse is in limestone with gritstone dressings, quoins, a continuous moulded string course stepped over the door, and a slate roof. There are two storeys and three bays, and a lean-to on the left. The doorway has a quoined and moulded surround, and over it is an initialled and dated plaque. The windows either have a single light, or are mullioned. In front of the garden is a limestone wall containing square gate piers with moulded cornices and ball finials. |
| Glutton Grange and barn 53.20061°N 1.87474°W | | Mid-18th century | The farmhouse, which was extended in the 19th century, is in limestone, with gritstone quoins, a stone slate roof over the main block, and a slate roof over the extension. There are three storeys and three bays, a two-storey single-bay extension to the right, and a barn attached to the left. In the centre is a doorway with a quoined surround and a rectangular fanlight, and in the centre of the top floor is a circular plaque. The windows in the main block are mullioned and contain casements, and in the extension they are top-hung casements. |
| Hurdlow Manor and barn 53.19696°N 1.82331°W | | 18th century | The farmhouse and barn under a continuous roof are in limestone with gritstone dressings, quoins, and a slate roof with coped gables and plain kneelers. On the front is a doorway with a quoined surround and a bracketed hood, to the right is a doorway with a chamfered surround and a four-centred arched head, and above is a small hayloft opening. The windows are mullioned with two lights, and contain casements. |
| Castle Cottage; 53.18424°N 1.85105°W | | Late 18th century | The cottage is in limestone and sandstone with gritstone dressings, quoins, and a stone slate roof. There are two storeys and two bays. The doorway and the windows, which are mullioned, have quoined surrounds. |
| Dowal Hall Farmhouse; 53.20457°N 1.88669°W | | Late 18th century | The farmhouse is in limestone with gritstone dressings, and a stone slate roof with coped gables and kneelers. There are three storeys and three bays. The central doorway has a rectangular fanlight and a bracketed hood, and the windows are mullioned, containing casements. |
| Abbots Grove; 53.19602°N 1.85617°W | | Early 19th century | The house is in limestone with sandstone dressings, quoins, and a stone slate roof with triangular finials. There are two storeys, a double pile plan, and three bays. In the centre is an elaborate porch with chamfered piers carrying a canopy, an incised segmental arch, a decorated keystone, and coped sides. The doorway and the windows, which are sashes, have quoined surrounds. The central section is raised and contains a plaque. |
| Crowdicote Bridge; 53.18293°N 1.85093°W | | Early 19th century | The bridge carries a road over the River Dove. It is in gritstone and consists of a single segmental arch. The bridge has voussoirs, a moulded string course, and parapets with square coping that curve and end in square piers. |
| Gate to west of Abbots Grove; 53.19616°N 1.85693°W | | Early 19th century | The gateway is in sandstone, and has chamfered square piers with plain capitals, a lintel with a segmental arch below, and a dropped keystone carved with flowers. Above, in the centre, is a raised block with flat copings and triangular finials. The gateway contains an iron gate. |
| Glutton Bridge; 53.19532°N 1.87614°W | | Early 19th century | The bridge carries a road over the River Dove. It is in gritstone and consists of a single span shallow arch bridge. It curves outward at each end with square piers. It has a segmental voussoired arch with plain parapets using square section copings. The bridge crosses into Staffordshire. |
| Hall Farmhouse, wall and gates 53.19948°N 1.86573°W | | Early 19th century | The farmhouse is in rendered limestone with gritstone dressings, quoins, and a tile roof with coped gables. There are two storeys, three bays, and a lower two-storey gabled wing projecting on the left. The central doorway has a quoined surround, a moulded architrave, and a moulded cornice. The windows in the main block are sashes, and in the wing are a mullioned window and a sash window. Enclosing the garden to the north is a coped stone wall containing square gate piers with moulded cornices and ball finials. |
| Lilac Cottage; 53.19976°N 1.86532°W | | Early 19th century | The cottage is in limestone with painted dressings and a stone slate roof. There are two storeys and two bays. The doorway has a quoined surround and a bracketed hood, and the windows are sashes. |
| Milepost; 53.18439°N 1.79821°W | | Early 19th century | The milepost on the southwest side of the A515 road is in cast iron. It has a triangular section, curving to a flat back with a segmental head. On the top are the distances to London and Derby, on the curving face is "HARTINGTON PARISH", and on the side faces are the distances to Ashbourne and Buxton, and details of the manufacturer. |
| St Michael's Church, Earl Sterndale; 53.20066°N 1.86569°W | | 1828–29 | The chancel was added to the church in 1877, and the interior of the church was rebuilt in 1950–52. It is built in limestone with gritstone dressings and slate roofs. The church consists of a nave, a narrow chancel, a north vestry, and a west tower. The tower has three stages, a south doorway with a moulded surround and a pointed arch, windows in the south and west faces with four-centred arches, a clock face, bell openings, and an embattled parapet. |
| Cotesfield Farmhouse; 53.17799°N 1.80084°W | | c. 1830 | A farmhouse in limestone with gritstone dressings, quoins, and a stone slate roof with coped gables and plain kneelers. There are three storeys, an L-shaped plan, and a front of two bays. Steps lead up to the doorway that has a partial quoined surround. The windows on the front are sashes, and at the rear are mullioned windows. |
| Earl Sterndale School; 53.20093°N 1.86587°W | | 1895 | The school is in limestone with gritstone dressings, quoins, and a stone slate roof with coped gables. There is a single storey and three bays. In the centre of the west front is a gabled porch with doors on the sides, and a dated plaque in the gable. The doorways and windows have moulded architraves, four-centred arched heads and moulded hood moulds. |
