= Jeff Kent (author) =

English author (born 1951)

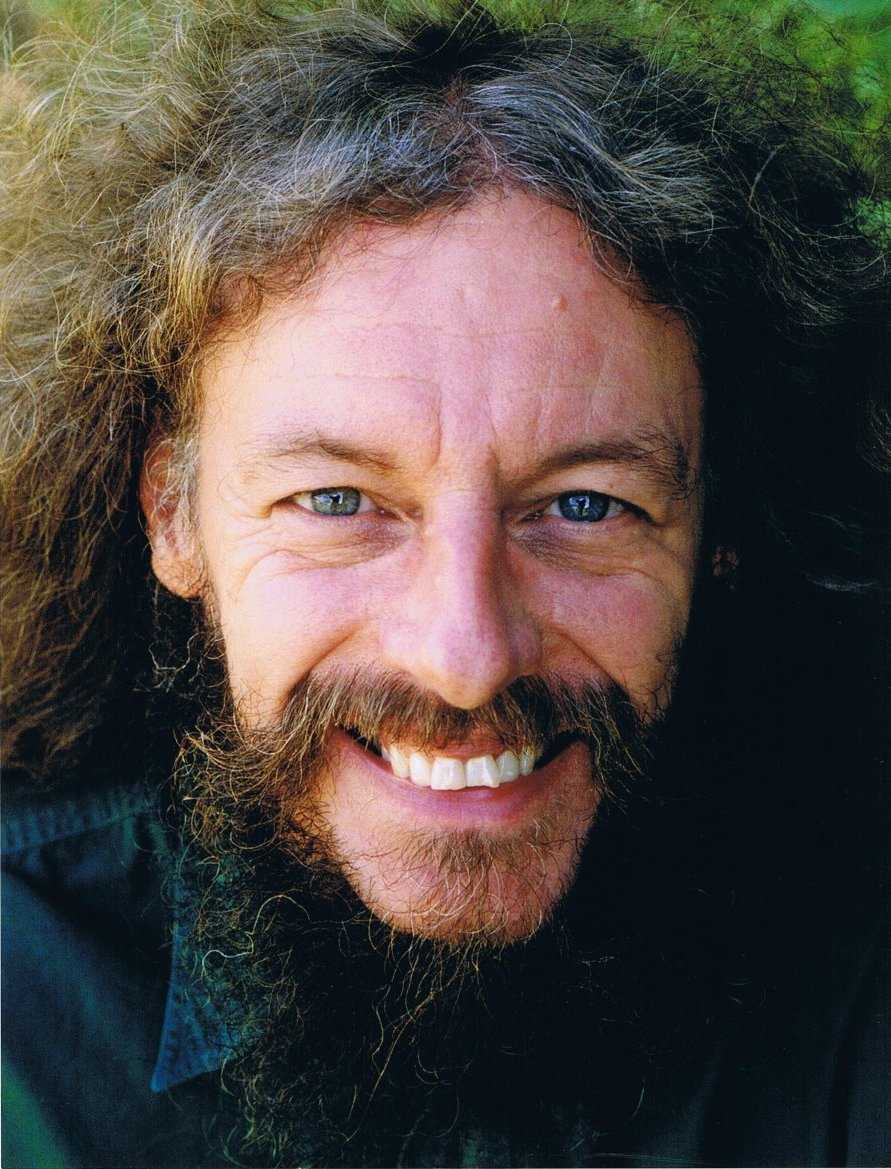
- Kent in 1999
- Born: Jeffrey John William Kent; 28 July 1951 (age 75); Hartshill, Stoke-on-Trent, England
- Citizenship: British
- Education: Degree in International Relations, 1973
- Alma mater: University of London, 1970–1973
- Occupations: Academic; author; musician; campaigner; publisher
- Relatives: Harry Poole (cousin)
- Writing career
- Subjects: Port Vale F.C., Rock music, Eric Burdon, double sunsets, regionalist and Green politics, the environment and education
- Notable works: The Valiants' Years: The Story of Port Vale; The Last Poet: The Story of Eric Burdon; The Mysterious Double Sunset; The Rise and Fall of Rock; Principles of Open Learning; Only One World (CD)

Jeffrey John William Kent (born 28 July 1951) is an English academic, musician, activist, and historian.

== Early life and education ==
Kent was born on 28 July 1951 in Hartshill, Stoke-on-Trent, England, and was educated at Hanley High School in Stoke-on-Trent. He gained an honours degree in international relations from the University of London in 1973 and a postgraduate certificate of education from Crewe College of Higher Education in 1974.

== Career ==
=== Teaching ===
Kent taught history and geography at Maryhill Comprehensive School, in Kidsgrove, from 1974 to 1975 and at Leek College from 1976 to 1980. In 1980, he lectured in general studies at Stoke-on-Trent Technical College. In 1991, he began lecturing in English at Stoke on Trent College and later in history, geography and international perspectives. From 1994 to 2010, he lectured in writing & publishing.

=== Writings ===
Kent became a freelance author in 1972 and wrote record reviews for Hard Graft magazine. In 1983, he published his first book, The Rise And Fall of Rock, a critical rock music history. It covered over 1,800 artists and 3,000 records. In 1987, he published Principles of Open Learning, an examination of a radical, flexible and student-centred method of education. In 1989, he published a biography of Eric Burdon, the lead singer of The Animals, entitled The Last Poet: The Story Of Eric Burdon, using material from extensive interviews with Burdon.

In 1989, Kent published the first of seven books on Port Vale Football Club, Back To Where We Once Belonged!: Port Vale Promotion Chronicle 1988–1989, which was a celebration of the club's return to the Second Division of the Football League. In 1990, Kent published a history of Port Vale, entitled The Valiants' Years: The Story Of Port Vale. In 1991, he published Port Vale Tales: A Collection Of Stories, Anecdotes And Memories, which featured the recollections of those closely connected with the club, including Mick Cullerton, Ken Hancock, Brian Horton, Stanley Matthews, Harry Poole, and Kent himself. In 1992, Kent published a Port Vale Forever song book to accompany his ten-track album of the same name. In 1993, he published The Port Vale Record 1879–1993, a history of Port Vale, cataloguing all the first-team's reported season by season results. Three years later, he published Port Vale Personalities: A Biographical Dictionary of Players, Officials and Supporters, which contained the biographies of numerous individuals (mainly footballers) involved with the club since its inception. In 1998, Kent published The Potteries Derbies, which outlined the story of the first-team matches between Port Vale and Stoke City.

Also in 2001, Kent published The Mysterious Double Sunset - a book about a solar phenomenon, traditionally observed on the summer solstice from St Edward's churchyard in Leek, Staffordshire, looking at The Cloud, 6.5 miles (10.5 km) to the northwest.

In 2011 he published his seventh book on Port Vale, entitled, What If There Had Been No Port in the Vale?: Startling Port Vale Stories.

In 2013, Kent published Staffordshire's 1,000-Foot Peaks, a guide to the 65 hills of the county which reached that height. In 2014, he published Peak Pictures, a book of southern Pennine landscapes. In 2015, Kent published Cheshire's 1,000-Foot Peaks, a guide to the 46 hills of the county reaching that height.

=== Publishing ===
Kent founded his own publishing house, Witan Books, in 1980. The Small Press Yearbook 1993 described Witan Books as 'a vehicle for the promotion of the works of Jeff Kent'.

=== Music ===
In the late 1970s, Kent was a pioneer of environmentally orientated music and released an animal rights protest single, Butcher's Tale, with his five-piece band The Witan, on Witan Records in 1981. They released a two-part environmental concept album, Tales from the Land of the Afterglow, in 1984. Kent then performed benefit concerts for several environmental and humanitarian organisations. In 1992, he released his first solo work, Port Vale Forever. In 2000, he released his ecological concept album Only One World. His musical style has most frequently been described as folk-rock, in a similar vein to Strawbs. From 2008 to 2013, Kent played percussion in the Glorishears of Brummagem morris dance band and claimed to have invented a new technique of playing the drum tambourine. In 2013, Kent co-founded Mercia Morris, in which he played various pieces of percussion strapped to his body, and he became the side's music co-ordinator. Some of his instrumental music was used to create the soundtrack of the film Pictures From The Potteries, released in 2014.

=== Films ===
Kent was historical adviser to a video documenting the origins and story of Port Vale. Entitled Up The Vale!, it was released in 1998. He was also historical adviser to Port Vale Football Club Millennium Documentary, released in 2000. In 2014, he created Pictures From The Potteries, a film of cine film highlights, shot by his father around Stoke-on-Trent from 1962 to 1988. It was premiered at Stoke Film Theatre on 19 November 2014 and released on DVD the same year.

=== Campaigns ===
Kent first began to campaign on an environmental and humanitarian platform in 1977 through his song lyrics. In 1980, he joined the Ecology Party and became a co-founder of the North Staffs Ecology Party that same year. In May 1984, he stood as the Ecology Party candidate for the Odd Rode ward in the Congleton Borough Council elections and polled 10.71% of the vote. Afterwards, he founded the South Cheshire Ecology Party. The following year, he joined the Ecology Party Education Working Group and was a contributor to its book, Routes to Change: A Collection of Essays for Green Education, published in 1988. The following year, he left the party (which by then had been renamed the Green Party).

In 1992, he joined the Movement For Middle England, which aimed 'To work for the full autonomy of Middle England [the greater Midlands] within a devolved England.' Convinced it could not achieve its objective, he left in 1993 and co-founded the Mercia Movement. Its objective was 'To re-create a legal autonomous Mercia as an organic democracy...' In 1997, he wrote and published The Mercia Manifesto: A blueprint for the future inspired by the past. He also released an ecological concept album, Only One World, in 2000.

In 2001, the Mercia Movement published A Draft Constitution For Mercia, mainly written by Kent. It aimed to put it before a regional constitutional convention. The Mercian Constitutional Convention was formed in Birmingham on 17 March 2001 with Kent elected convener. The convention finally published The Constitution of Mercia, claiming to be 'the ultimate legal authority in Mercia'. On 29 May 2003, Kent and two other members of the convention declared the legal independence of Mercia, in Victoria Square, Birmingham. The convention renamed itself the Acting Witan of Mercia.

=== Other activities ===
Kent served as the chairman of the Port Vale Supporters' Group from January 1992 to July 1994 and was co-ordinator of the Save the Vale campaign and Vale Supporter Links in 2003.

In 2012, Kent claimed to be the first person to climb all 65 of Staffordshire's 1,000-foot peaks. In 2014, he climbed all 46 of Cheshire's 1,000-foot peaks, In 2015 and 2016, he ascended all 197 of Shropshire's 1,000-foot peaks.

== Discography ==
Singles:

- Butcher's Tale/Annie, with the Dancing Eyes – Jeff Kent & The Witan (WTN 001, 1981).

Albums:

- Tales from the Land of the Afterglow, Part 1 – Jeff Kent & The Witan (WTN 003, 1984)..
- Tales from the Land of the Afterglow, Part 2 – Jeff Kent & The Witan (WTN 004, 1984).
- Port Vale Forever – Jeff Kent (WTN 024, 1992).
- Only One World – Jeff Kent (WTN 030, 2000).

== Selected publications ==
Self-published:

- The Rise and Fall of Rock (Witan Books, 1983, ISBN 0-9508981-0-4).
- The Last Poet: The Story of Eric Burdon. (Witan Books, 1989, ISBN 0-9508981-2-0).o
- The Valiants' Years: The Story of Port Vale (Witan Books, 1990, ISBN 0-9508981-4-7).
- Port Vale Tales: A Collection of Stories, Anecdotes And Memories (Witan Books, 1991, ISBN 0-9508981-6-3).
- Port Vale Forever (Witan Books, 1992, ISBN 0-9508981-8-X).
- Port Vale Personalities: A Biographical Dictionary of Players, Officials and Supporters (Witan Books, 1996, ISBN 0-9529152-0-0).
- The Potteries Derbies (Witan Books, 1998, ISBN 0-9529152-3-5).
- The Mysterious Double Sunset (Witan Books, 2001, ISBN 0-9529152-5-1).
- What if There Had Been No Port in the Vale?: Startling Port Vale Stories! (Witan Books, 2011, ISBN 978-0-9529152-8-7).
- Staffordshire's 1,000-Foot Peaks (Witan Books, 2013, ISBN 978-0-9927505-0-3).
- Cheshire's 1,000-Foot Peaks (Witan Books, 2015, ISBN 978-0-9927505-2-7).

Co-author:

- Routes to Change: A Collection Of Essays For Green Education (The Green Party Education Working Group, 1988, ISBN 0-9514065-0-7).
- 100 Walks in Staffordshire (The Crowood Press, 1992, ISBN 1-85223-522-5).
