= Beinn a' Chaolais =

Lowest peak of the Paps of Jura on the island of Jura, Scotland

Coordinates: 55.88802°N 6.01879°W

Beinn a'Chaolais
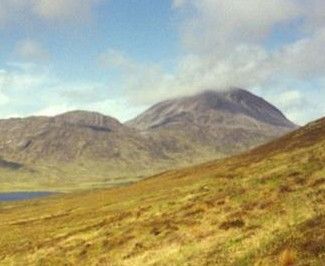
- Beinn a' Chaolais from the south eastern slope of Beinn Shiantaidh

Highest point
- Elevation: 733 m (2,405 ft)
- Prominence: 359 m (1,178 ft)
- Parent peak: Beinn an Òir
- Listing: Marilyn, Graham

Naming
- English translation: mountain of the sound/strait
- Language of name: Gaelic

Geography
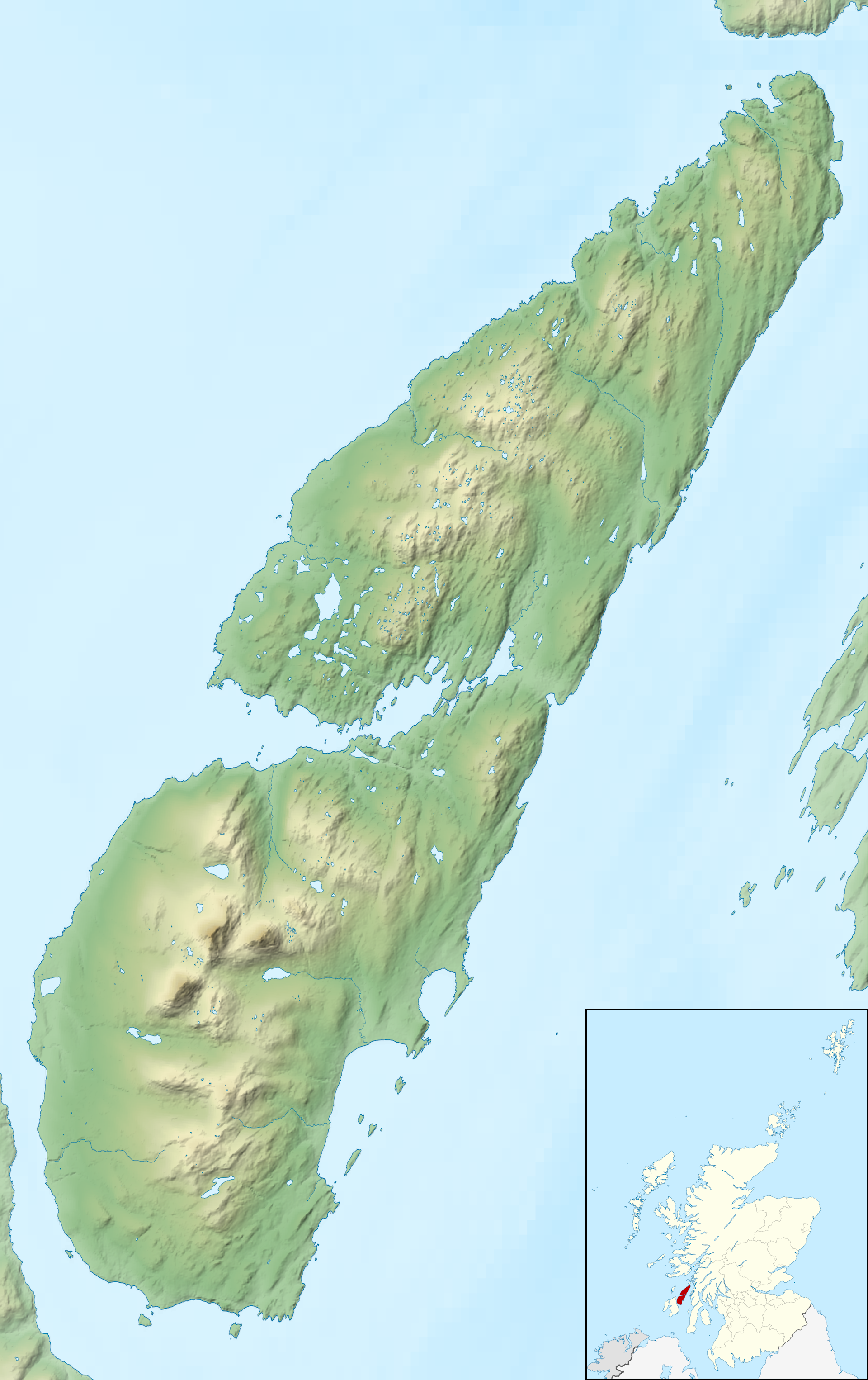
- Location within Jura
- Location: Jura, Scotland
- Parent range: Paps of Jura
- OS grid: NR488734
- Topo map: OS Landrangers 60, 61

Beinn a' Chaolais (Gaelic: mountain of the sound or strait) is the lowest peak of the Paps of Jura on the island of Jura, Scotland.

It stands at 733 metres above sea level, and with over 300 metres of relative height is therefore a Graham.
