= Reef knoll =

Accumulated calcareous material on an ancient seabed

A reef knoll is a landform that comprises an immense pile of calcareous material that had previously accumulated on an ancient sea floor. Reef knolls are geological remnants of reefs and other organic concentrations of calcareous organisms. Reef knolls are often fossil-rich, with prehistoric corals, sponges, calcareous algae, and other reef-builders contributing to a large portion of the structure's volume. This density of skeletal material allows the structure to withstand sea currents and stand freely.

Reef knolls can be divided into bioherms and biostromes. A bioherm is a landform of organic sedimentary rock enclosed or surrounded by rock of different origin. A biostrome is a distinctly bedded or broadly lenticular sedimentary rock landform. Krumbein additionally used these terms to distinguish different shapes of stromatolites: "Distinctly bedded, widely extensive, blanketlike build-ups are biostromes. Nodular, biscuit-like, dome-shaped or columnar stromatolites are also referred to as bioherms".

== England ==
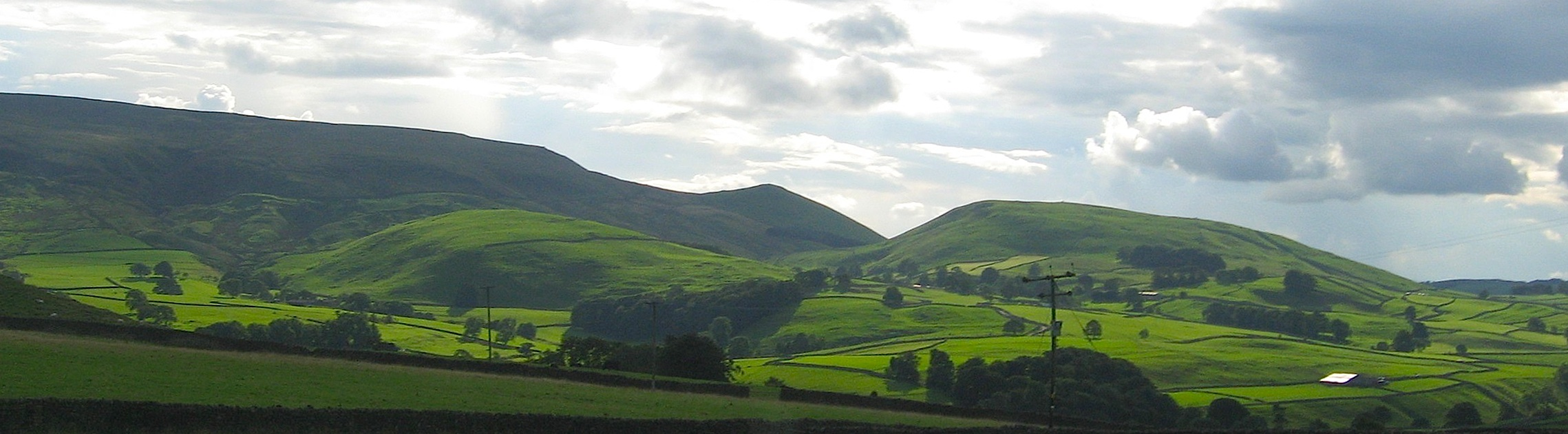
Thorpe Kail, Stebden and Elbolton hills, against Thorpe Fell, from north east, near Hebden

Examples on the Derbyshire/Staffordshire border include Thorpe Cloud and Bunster Hill in southern Dovedale, and also Chrome Hill and Parkhouse Hill at the northern end.

These structures are often most clearly seen where the surrounding rocks are much softer and so can be preferentially eroded. All the Derbyshire examples quoted lie at the edge of the limestone areas; Chrome and Parkhouse lie at the divide between limestone and the much softer shale.

Examples in the Yorkshire Dales lie on the downthrow side (north) of the Mid Craven Fault. There is one set located around Thorpe (Skelterton, Butter Haw, Stebden, Elbolton, Thorpe Kail, Myra Bank and Hartlington Kail); one set located around Malham (Burns Hill, Cawden, and Wedber); and a set around Settle (High Hill and Scaleber).

It was once proposed that in Lancashire, reef knolls could be seen between the villages of Worston and Downham near Clitheroe.

== See also ==
- Waulsortian mudmound
