= Acting Witan of Mercia =

Political organisation in England

The Acting Witan of Mercia
- White Wyrm of Mercia
- Predecessor: Mercia Movement
- Formation: 17 March 2001
- Founded at: Birmingham, England
- Type: Political activism, Mercian independence
- Website: www.independentmercia.org
- Formerly called: Mercian Constitutional Convention

The Acting Witan of Mercia is a political group based in the Midlands of England. It believes that the United Kingdom is in illegal occupation of the ancient English region of Mercia, as a result of the Norman Conquest and the perceived Norman Yoke, and the Acting Witan claims to be its de jure and acting government.

== Origins ==
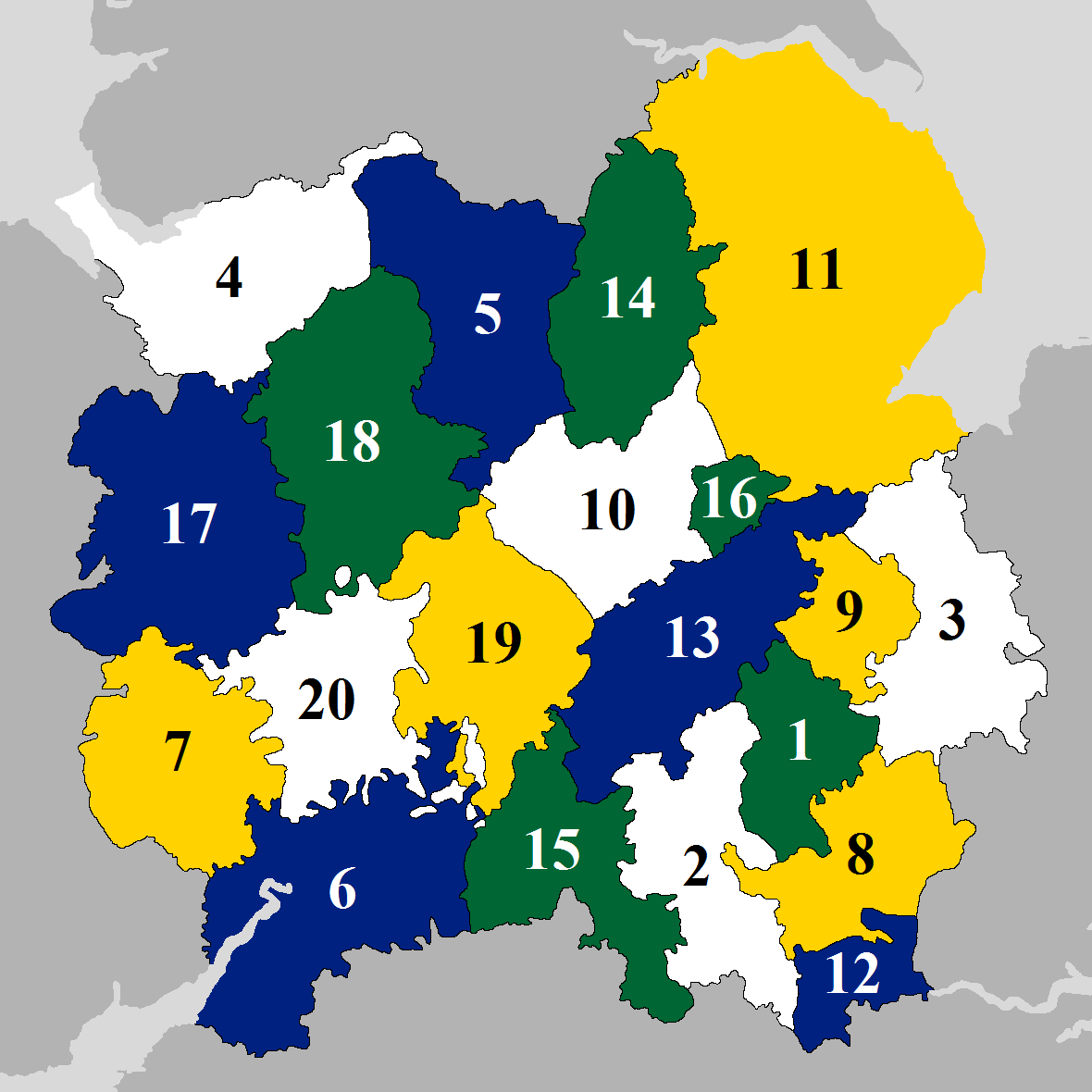
The Twenty Shires of Mercia

The Mercia Movement was formed in 1993 to produce the blueprint for the Draft Constitution for Mercia, along with a work entitled 'The Mercia Manifesto: A blueprint for the future inspired by the past'. The Mercian Constitutional Convention was formed in Birmingham on 17 March 2001 and decided to accept the Draft Constitution for Mercia as the basis for its deliberations. The Convention debated the draft for over two years and passed a series of amendments to it, although the essence of the draft remained the same and most of its content was unaltered. The Convention published the final draft of its work as The Constitution Of Mercia, a 21-page booklet, in 2003. It consisted of 28 Articles and numerous sub-articles and claimed to be 'the ultimate legal authority in Mercia', stated in Article 1.1 to 'comprise its historic twenty shires ([1] Bedfordshire, [2] Buckinghamshire, [3] Cambridgeshire, [4] Cheshire, [5] Derbyshire, [6] Gloucestershire, [7] Herefordshire, [8] Hertfordshire, [9] Huntingdonshire, [10] Leicestershire, [11] Lincolnshire, [12] Middlesex, [13] Northamptonshire, [14] Nottinghamshire, [15] Oxfordshire, [16] Rutland, [17] Shropshire, [18] Staffordshire, [19] Warwickshire and [20] Worcestershire) or such of these as find a common Mercian identity and wish to be included in the region'. The Constitution offered a new holistic society in Mercia, based on organic democracy, co-operative community and ecological balance.

== Formation and campaigns ==
Declaration of Mercian Independence

On 29 May 2003, Jeff Kent, Joyce Millington, and David Bastable issued the "Declaration of Mercian Independence", in Victoria Square, Birmingham, in the heart of the region. After the declaration, the Convention renamed itself the Acting Witan of Mercia, which aimed to spearhead the full democratisation of the region and the re-establishment of its de facto independence. On 29 May 2004, the first Mercian Independence Day anniversary, members of the Acting Witan launched a new currency for the region, the Mercian penny, in Victoria Square, Birmingham, and handed out the coins free to people who registered as citizens of Mercia. By May 2009, over 2,000 people had registered as Mercian citizens. On 26 February 2010, outside the Potteries Museum & Art Gallery, in Stoke-on-Trent, the purported "convener of the Acting Witan" (Jeff Kent) and the purported "Acting Sheriff of Staffordshire" (Philip Snow) made a declaration claiming the Staffordshire Hoard to be the property of the citizens of Mercia.

== See also ==
- Regionalism (politics)
- Secession
