= Parkhouse Hill =

Hill in Derbyshire, England

Coordinates: 53.19912°N 1.88320°W

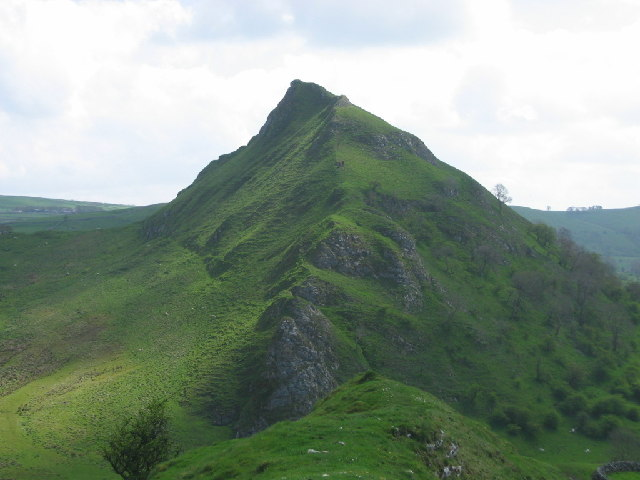

Highest point
- Elevation: c. 360 m (c. 1,180 ft)
- Prominence: c. 35 m

Geography
- Location: Hartington Middle Quarter civil parish, Derbyshire, Peak District, England
- OS grid: SK079669
- Topo map: OS Landranger 119

Parkhouse Hill is a small but distinctive hill in the Peak District National Park of the Hartington Middle Quarter civil parish, in the English county of Derbyshire. It lies on the north side of the River Dove, close to the border with Staffordshire.

Geologically, the hill is the remains of an atoll (a 'reef knoll') which is believed to have existed during the Carboniferous period when what is now the Peak District was covered by a tropical sea. Together with its higher but less distinctive neighbour, Chrome Hill, it forms the Chrome and Parkhouse Hills SSSI, cited for their geology and limestone flora. The walk over Chrome Hill and Parkhouse Hill is known as the Dragon's Back ridge.

For many years access to Parkhouse Hill was difficult, as there was no right of way to the summit. Access is now possible under the Countryside and Rights of Way Act 2000, as the hill is a designated access area. The path over the summit is rocky and steep and requires caution and a good level of fitness.

A double sunset can sometimes be seen against Parkhouse Hill from nearby Glutton Grange; the phenomenon was first captured on film by the photographer Chris Doherty. The occurrence is visible in good weather in late March, early April and September, when the sun sets just to the south of the summit of the hill, begins to re-emerge almost immediately afterwards from its steep northern slope before fully reappearing and later sets for a second and final time at the foot of the hill.
