= The Cloud (hill) =

Prominent hill in England's Peak District

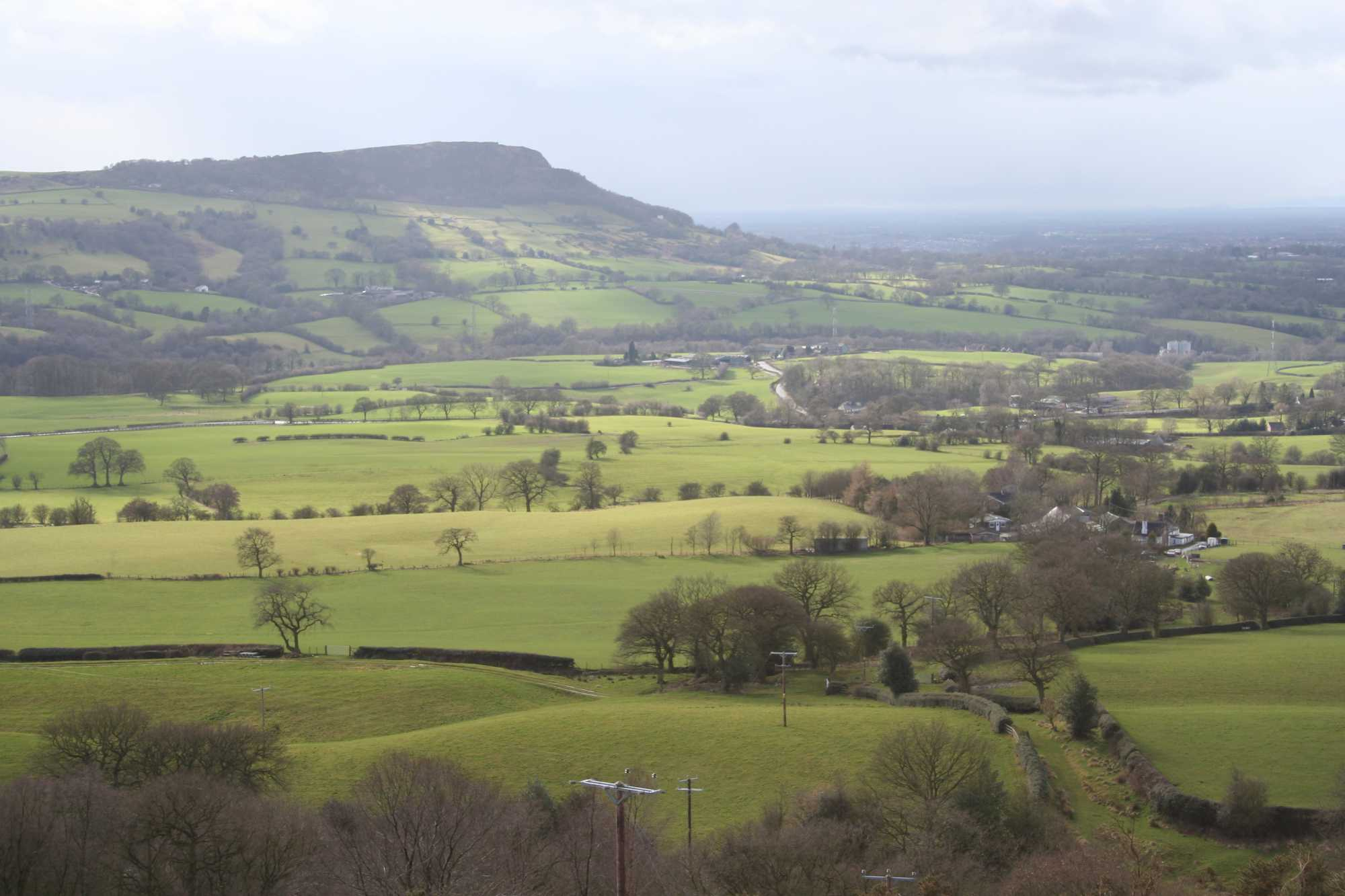

Highest point
- Elevation: 343 m (1,125 ft)
- Prominence: 174 m (571 ft)
- Listing: Marilyn
- Coordinates: 53°10′12″N 2°08′40″W

Geography
- Location: Cheshire, Staffordshire, England
- Parent range: Peak District
- OS grid: SJ904636
- Topo map: OS Landranger 118

The Cloud or Bosley Cloud is a prominent hill on the border between Cheshire and Staffordshire a couple of miles west of the Peak District National Park boundary.

At 343 metres (1,125 ft) in height, it is one of the highest hills in the area. Its heather-covered summit plateau is crowned by a trig point from which there are extensive views over Congleton, Biddulph, Macclesfield, Holmes Chapel and the Greater Manchester area.

The Cloud is at the northern apex of a triangle formed by the broken ridge which runs along the border between Cheshire and Staffordshire and the hills stretching south through Biddulph Moor into Staffordshire. To its north, the River Dane wraps around its lower slopes whilst the A523 road runs to its east through the village of Bosley in Southeast Cheshire.

Even though The Cloud is just outside of the official boundary of the Peak District National Park, it is one of the 95 Ethels hills of the Peak District, launched by the countryside charity CPRE in 2021.

== Geology ==
The summit and upper slopes are formed from the coarse and pebbly Chatsworth Grit, a thick sandstone which forms a part of the Millstone Grit and which dates from the Namurian stage of the Carboniferous period. The lower slopes are formed from mudstones which are not generally exposed. The hill owes its shape in part to the passage of ice around its flanks in successive ice ages.

== Access ==
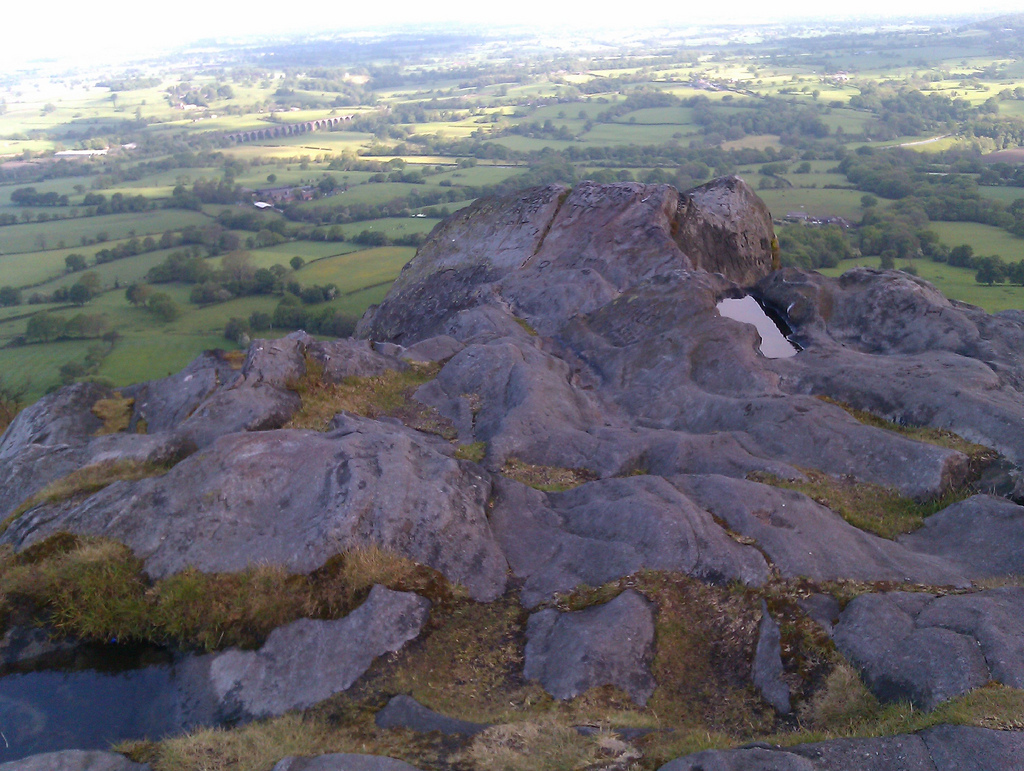
View of the Cheshire Plain from the top of the Cloud

The summit and adjacent slopes of the hill are owned by the National Trust and so have been available for public access over many years, a situation reinforced by the additional pedestrian access measures provided by the Countryside and Rights of Way Act 2000. Several public footpaths cross the hill and provide links with the network of minor roads which run around its lower slopes. The shared route of the Staffordshire Way and the Gritstone Trail recreational paths runs up to the summit from Timbersbrook en route for the Dane Valley.

== Double sunset ==
The double sunset is a locally celebrated astro-geographical phenomenon, which was traditionally seen against The Cloud from the churchyard of Saint Edward the Confessor in Leek, in Staffordshire, on the summer solstice. In clear weather, the sun sets on the summit of the hill, partially reappears from The Cloud's steep northern slope and soon afterwards sets for a second and final time on the horizon. The occurrence was first recorded in writing in 1686 by Robert Plot in his book The Natural History Of Stafford-shire, and may well have been observed for centuries before then. The spectacle is no longer visible from its traditional observation point because of tree interference, but can still be witnessed on the summer solstice from Leek: from Lowe Hill, on the outskirts of the town, and from the road to Pickwood Hall, off Milltown Way. Better observation sites of the phenomenon are from the A523 above Rudyard Lake, and Woodhouse Green.
