= Paps of Jura =

Hebridean Mountains

Coordinates: 55°53′15″N 6°01′10″W

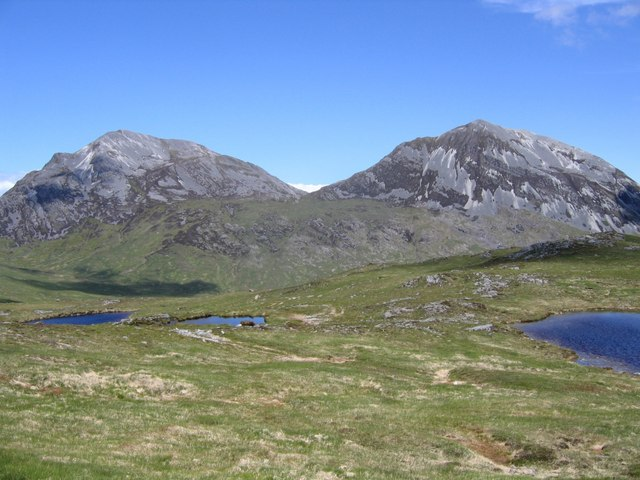
- Beinn an Oir on the left and Beinn Shiantaidh on right

Highest point
- Elevation: 2,575 ft (785 m)
- Listing: Corbett, Breast-shaped hills

Geography
- Location: Jura, Scotland

Climbing
- First ascent: Unknown
- Easiest route: From Craighouse

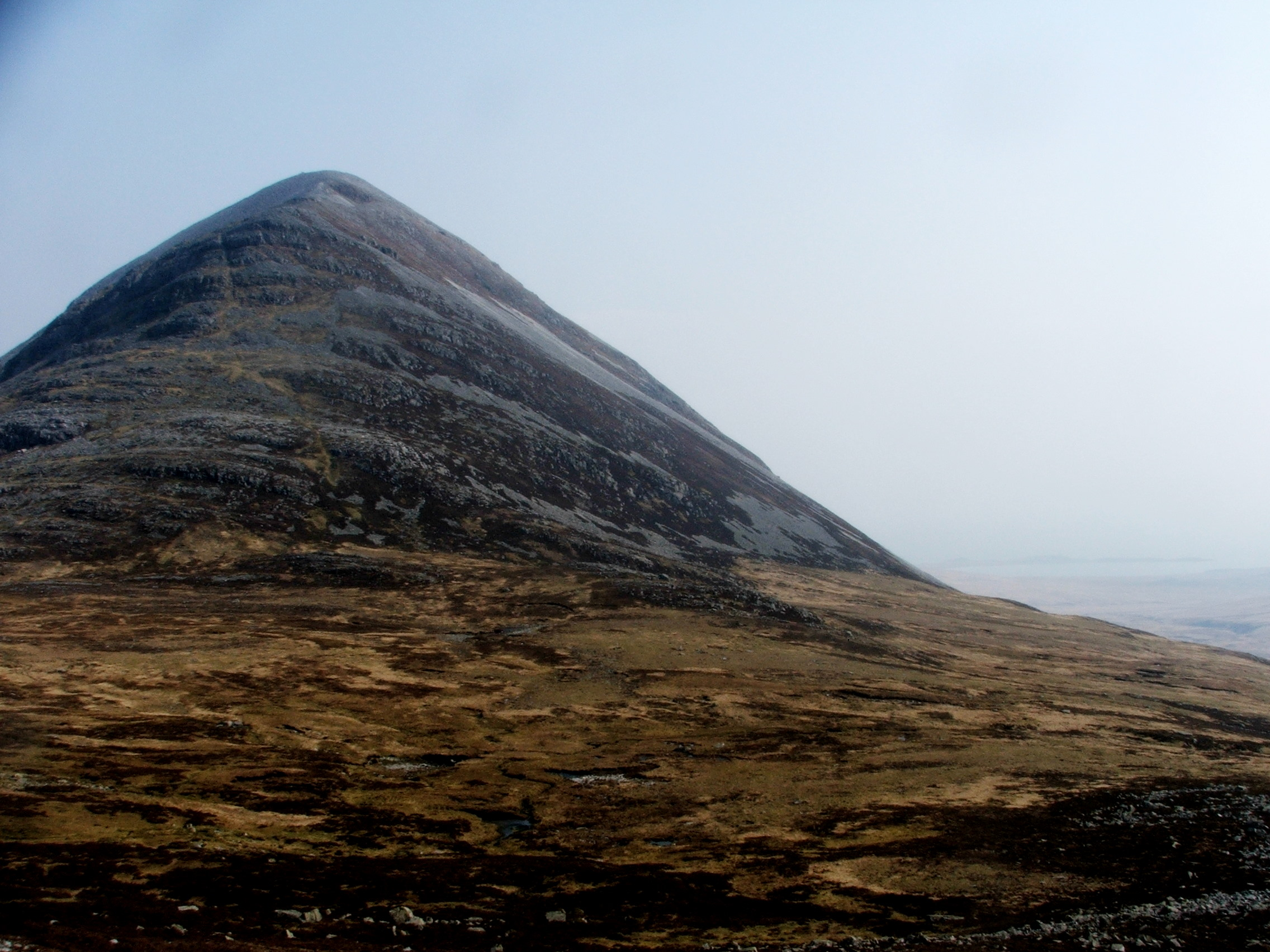
Beinn Shiantaidh from the south

The Paps of Jura (Scottish Gaelic: Sgùrr na Cìche) are three mountains on the western side of the island of Jura, in the Inner Hebrides of Scotland. Their highest point is 2,575 feet (785 m).

They are steep-sided quartzite hills with distinctive conical shapes resembling breasts. The word pap is an ancient word of Old Norse origin for the breast. The Paps are conspicuous hills that dominate the island landscape as well as the landscape of the surrounding area. They can be seen from the Mull of Kintyre and, on a clear day, Skye, Northern Ireland, and Malin Head.

One of the simplest routes of ascent starts from Craighouse. The route of the annual Isle of Jura Fell Race includes all three Paps and four other hills.

When viewed from Kintraw Argyll the midwinter sun briefly shines between two of the paps just before setting.

These hills were the subject of William McTaggart's 1902 painting The Paps of Jura, now displayed in the Kelvingrove Art Gallery and Museum.

== Mountains ==
- Beinn an Òir (Gaelic: mountain of gold) is the highest hill on Jura, standing at 2,575 feet (785 m), and is therefore a Corbett.
- Beinn Shiantaidh (Gaelic: holy mountain) stands at 2,477 feet (755 m) high.
- Beinn a' Chaolais (Gaelic: mountain of the kyle) is the lowest of the Paps, reaching 2,408 feet (734 m).

== See also ==
- List of mountains in Scotland
- Maiden Paps (disambiguation)
