= Earl Sterndale =

Village in Derbyshire, England

Coordinates: 53.200°N 1.865°W

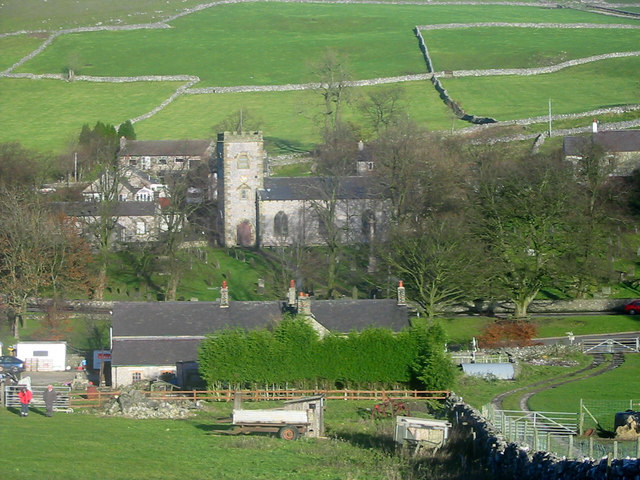
- From the southwest

- Location within Derbyshire
- Civil parish: Hartington Middle Quarter
- District: Derbyshire Dales
- Shire county: Derbyshire
- Region: East Midlands
- Country: England
- Sovereign state: United Kingdom
- Post town: BUXTON
- Postcode district: SK17
- Dialling code: 01298
- Police: Derbyshire
- Fire: Derbyshire
- Ambulance: East Midlands
- UK Parliament: Derbyshire Dales

Earl Sterndale is a village in the Upper Dove Valley in the Peak District, Derbyshire, England, situated near the River Dove, 5 miles south of Buxton, and 8 miles west of Bakewell. The population at the 2011 Census is listed under Hartington Middle Quarter. It is 1,100 feet (340 m) above sea level. The farms surrounding the village were medieval monastic granges in the care of the monks of Basingwerk Abbey.

== St Michael's Church ==
The village church, dedicated to St Michael, was built in 1828 on the site of an ancient chapel by George Ernest Hamilton. An enlarged chancel was added to the design of Robert Rippon Duke in 1877. It was substantially damaged in 1941 when it was bombed by the Germans, who were probably aiming for a nearby explosives dump, and was restored in 1952. It contains a 12th century baptismal font. It is a Grade II listed building.

== See also ==
- List of places in Derbyshire
- Listed buildings in Hartington Middle Quarter
