= Chrome Hill =

Limestone reef knoll in Derbyshire, England

Coordinates: 53.20273°N 1.89666°W

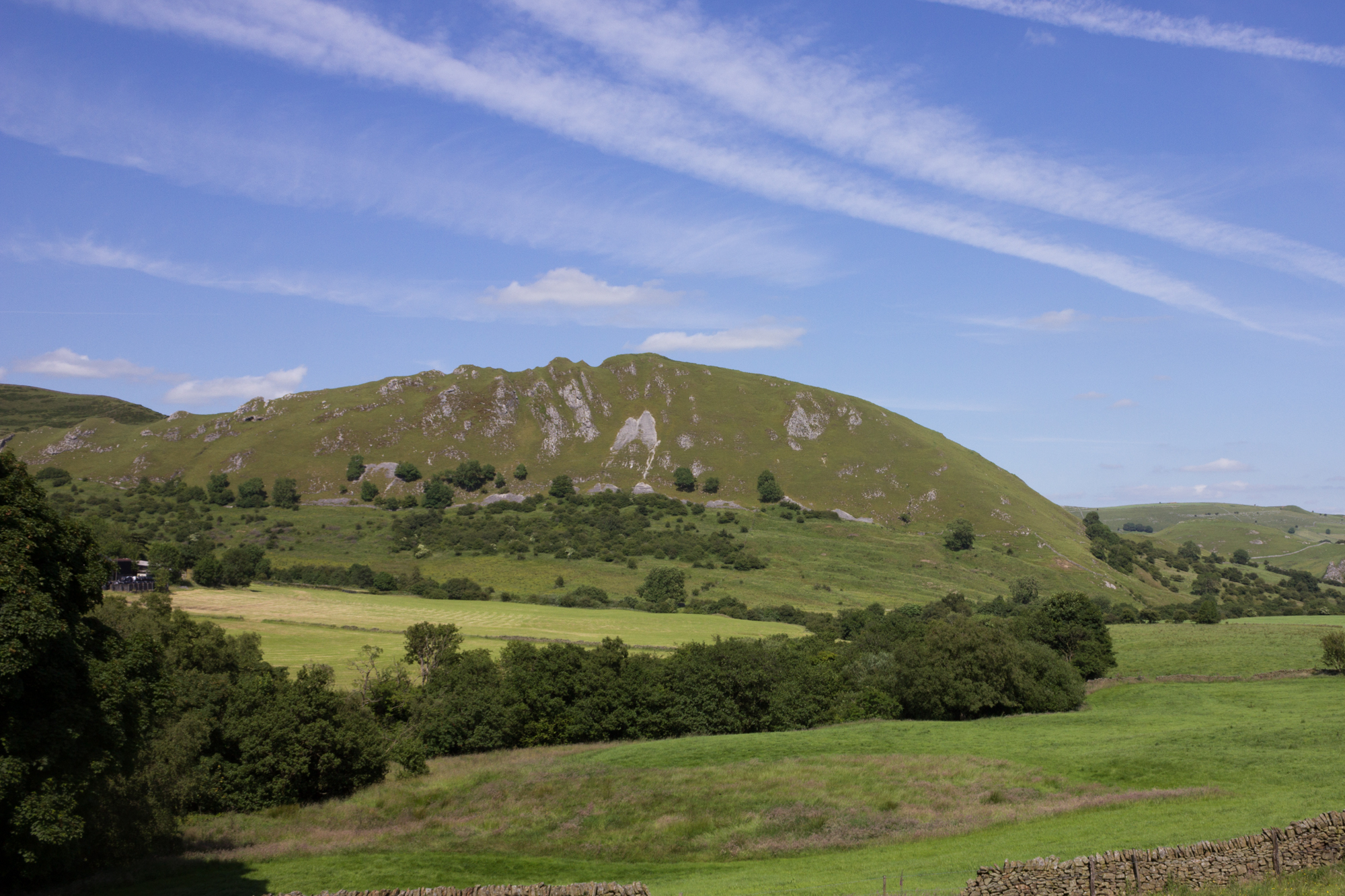
- Chrome Hill viewed from the southwest

Highest point
- Elevation: c. 425 m (c. 1394 ft)

Geography
- Location: Hartington Middle Quarter civil parish, Peak District, Derbyshire, England
- OS grid: SK070673
- Topo map: OS Landranger 119

Chrome Hill /ˈkruːm/ is a limestone reef knoll in Derbyshire, England, in the upper Dove valley beside the border with Staffordshire, within the civil parish of Hartington Middle Quarter. It is adjacent to Parkhouse Hill, another reef knoll. The walk over Chrome Hill and Parkhouse Hill is known as the Dragon's Back ridge.

Chrome Hill was declared open access land under the provisions of the Countryside and Rights of Way Act 2000. However, the only access from the north west remains along a concessionary footpath. Chrome Hill contains good exposures of Gigantoproductus fossils; it is part of a designated Site of Special Scientific Interest which makes it an offence for visitors to remove geological samples.

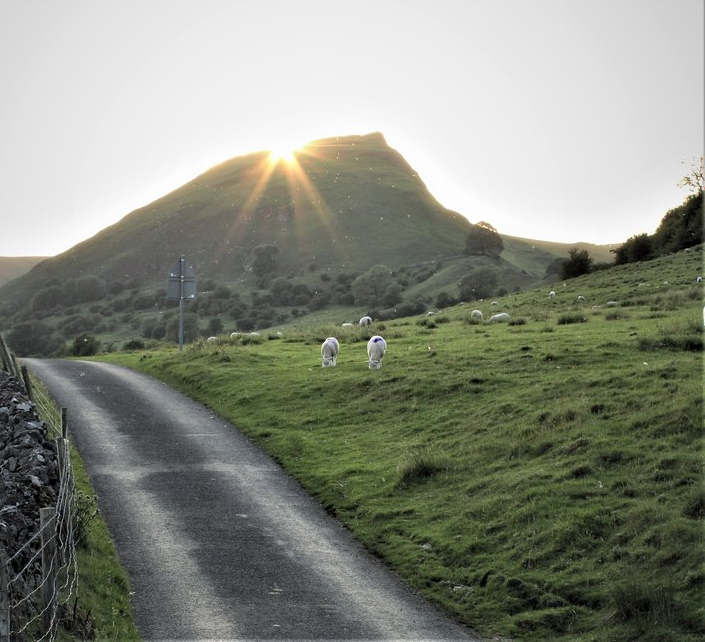
First sunset

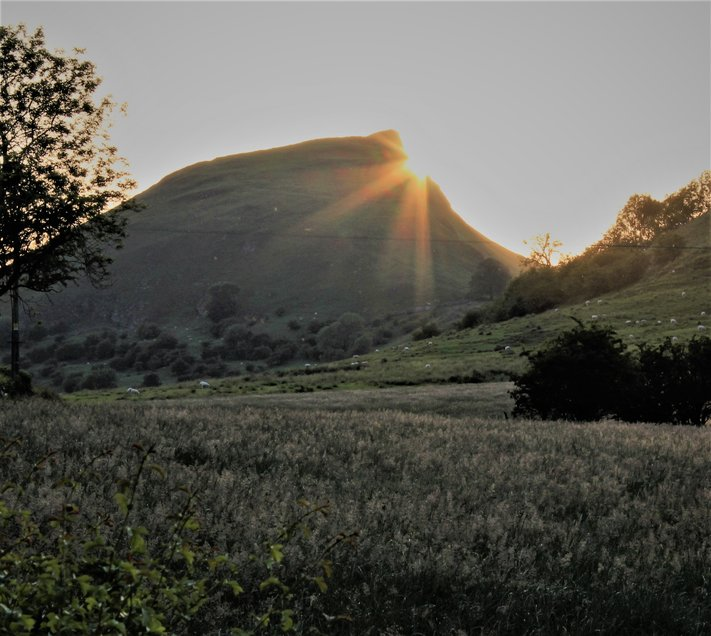
Re-emergence a few minutes later

The sun setting and re-emerging behind Chrome Hill, part of the location's midsummer double sunset. The second setting occurs in the dip to the right.

A double sunset can sometimes be seen against Chrome Hill from the southern flank of Parkhouse Hill; and also from nearby Glutton Bridge, on the upper valley of the River Dove, which is more easily accessible. The phenomenon is visible from Glutton Bridge in good weather for a short period around the summer solstice, when the sun sets just to the southwest of the summit of Chrome Hill, begins to re-emerge almost immediately afterwards from its steep northeastern slope before fully reappearing and later sets for a second and final time at the foot of the hill.

Chrome Hill has had songs written in its honour by the Norwegian musicians Sigurd Hole (Chrome Hill) and Jonas Howden Sjøvaag (Up on Chrome Hill). In 2008 the Norwegian jazz quartet Damp changed its name to Chrome Hill.

Broadcast in 2022, the final episode of the final season of Peaky Blinders was filmed overlooking Chrome Hill.
