= Beinn Shiantaidh =

Second highest peak of the Paps of Jura on the island of Jura, Scotland

Coordinates: 55.90097°N 5.98011°W

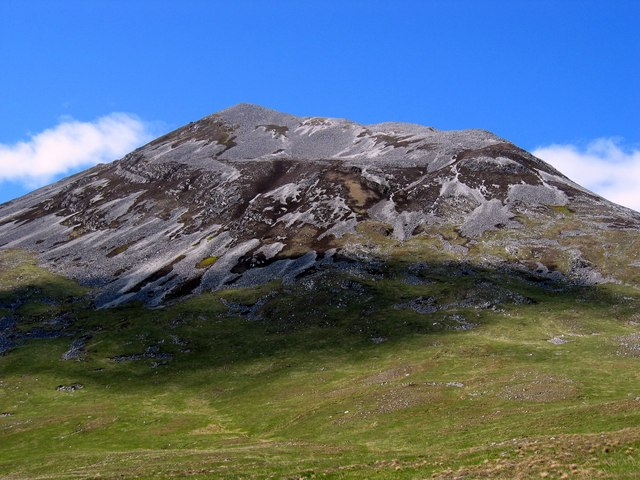
- Beinn Shiantaidh

Highest point
- Elevation: 757 m (2,484 ft)
- Prominence: 303 m (994 ft)
- Listing: Marilyn, Graham

Naming
- English translation: holy mountain
- Language of name: Gaelic
- Pronunciation: Scottish Gaelic: [peɲ ˈhiən̪ˠt̪ɪ]

Geography
- Location: Jura, Scotland
- Parent range: Paps of Jura
- OS grid: NR513747
- Topo map: OS Landranger 61

Beinn Shiantaidh (Scottish Gaelic for 'holy mountain') is the second highest peak of the Paps of Jura on the island of Jura, Scotland. It stands at 757 metres above sea level, and with over 300 metres of relative height is therefore a Graham.
