= Islay single malts =

Scotch whisky distilled on Islay, Scotland

Whisky producing regions of Scotland

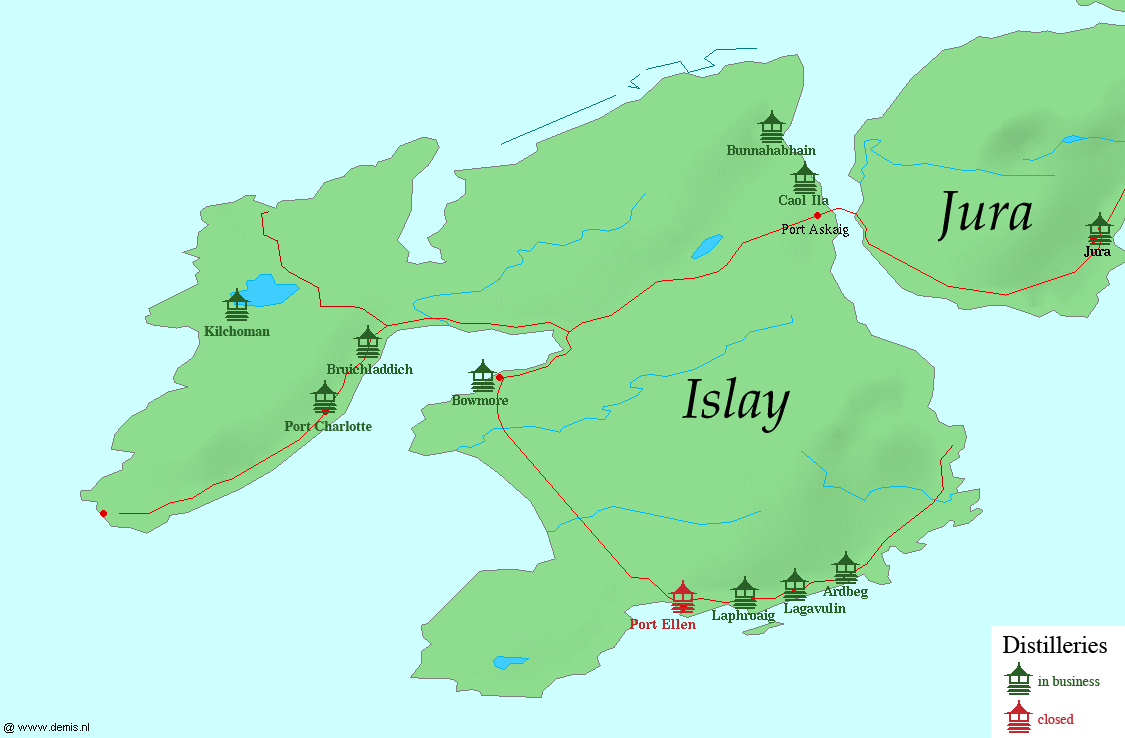
Distilleries on Islay as of 2011, not yet including Ardnahoe

Islay single malts are the single malt Scotch whiskies made on Islay (/ˈaɪlə/ EYE-lə) or Ìle in Gaelic, one of the southernmost of the Inner Hebridean Islands located off the west coast of Scotland. Islay is one of five whisky distilling localities and regions in Scotland whose identity is protected by law.

The region is characterised by whiskies with a peat smoke aroma, such as Laphroaig, Lagavulin and Ardbeg. In total, there are ten active distilleries on this island which measures only 25 by 15 miles (40 by 24 kilometres), and the industry is Islay's second largest employer after agriculture. Islay is a centre of "whisky tourism", and hosts a "Festival of Malt and Music" known as Fèis Ìle each year on the last week of May, with events and tastings celebrating the cultural heritage of the island.

== History ==
Some sources indicate that Irish monks may have been the first to distill whisky on the island in the early 1300s. According to Visit Scotland, "most of Islay's original distilleries [some no longer in business] started as farm distilleries and retreated to secluded glens and caves during the 17th century when the excise man came calling."

Another source is more specific: "Islay’s past is pervaded by innumerable tales of home distilling, smuggling and illegal whisky production" and adds that the eight older distilleries all began as small, illicit producers. All were built near water since grain was shipped on boats and the finished whisky was transported via water. For centuries, the whisky was usually aged in sherry casks but bourbon casks from the U.S. are now also frequently used.

In 1806, the Right Hon. Allan Maconochie, Lord Meadowbank at the Circuit Court at Inverary heard the case against Donald, Duncan and Neil, sons of Dugald Mackiachan, all residing in the island of Islay, accused of breaking into a room or cellar possessed by Benjamin Campbell, activing supervisor in said island, and stealing from thence 125 gallons of whisky, and they failing to appear to stand trial, sentence of fugitation was pronounced against them.

== Styles of whisky ==
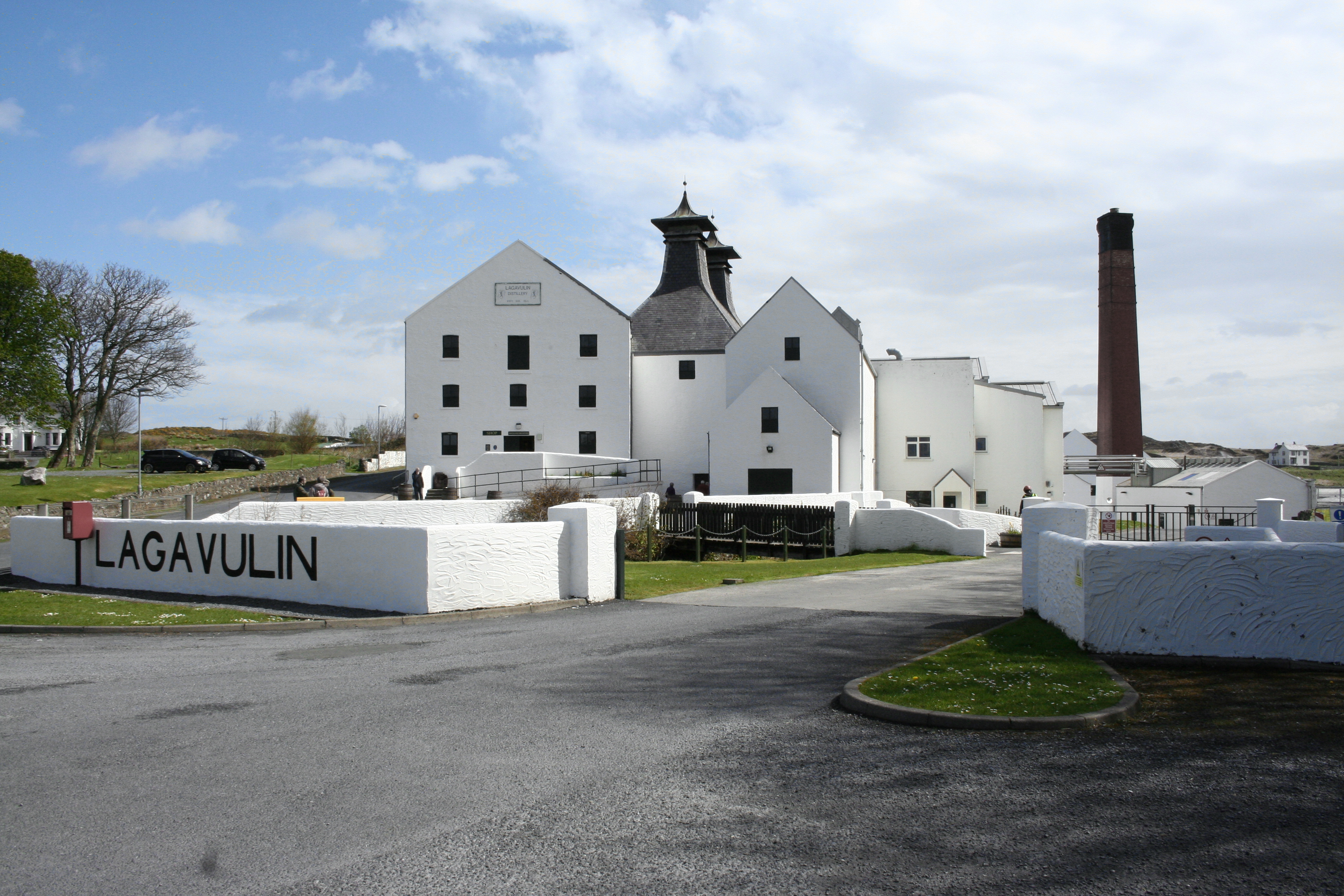
The Lagavulin distillery (2015)

The whiskies of the distilleries along the southeastern coast of the island, Laphroaig, Lagavulin, and Ardbeg, have a smoky character derived from peat, considered a central characteristic of the Islay malts, and ascribed both to the water from which the whisky is made and to the peating levels of the barley. Many describe this as a "medicinal" flavour. They also possess notes of iodine, seaweed and salt. Caol Ila, on the northern side of the island, across from Jura, also produces a strongly peated whisky. Trees, other than plantations, on these islands are scattered and the peat is free of rotting wood. (Normal peat bogs are invaded by trees and periodic fires kill the encroaching tree line.) Islay peat is reputedly the best flavoured for scotch production.

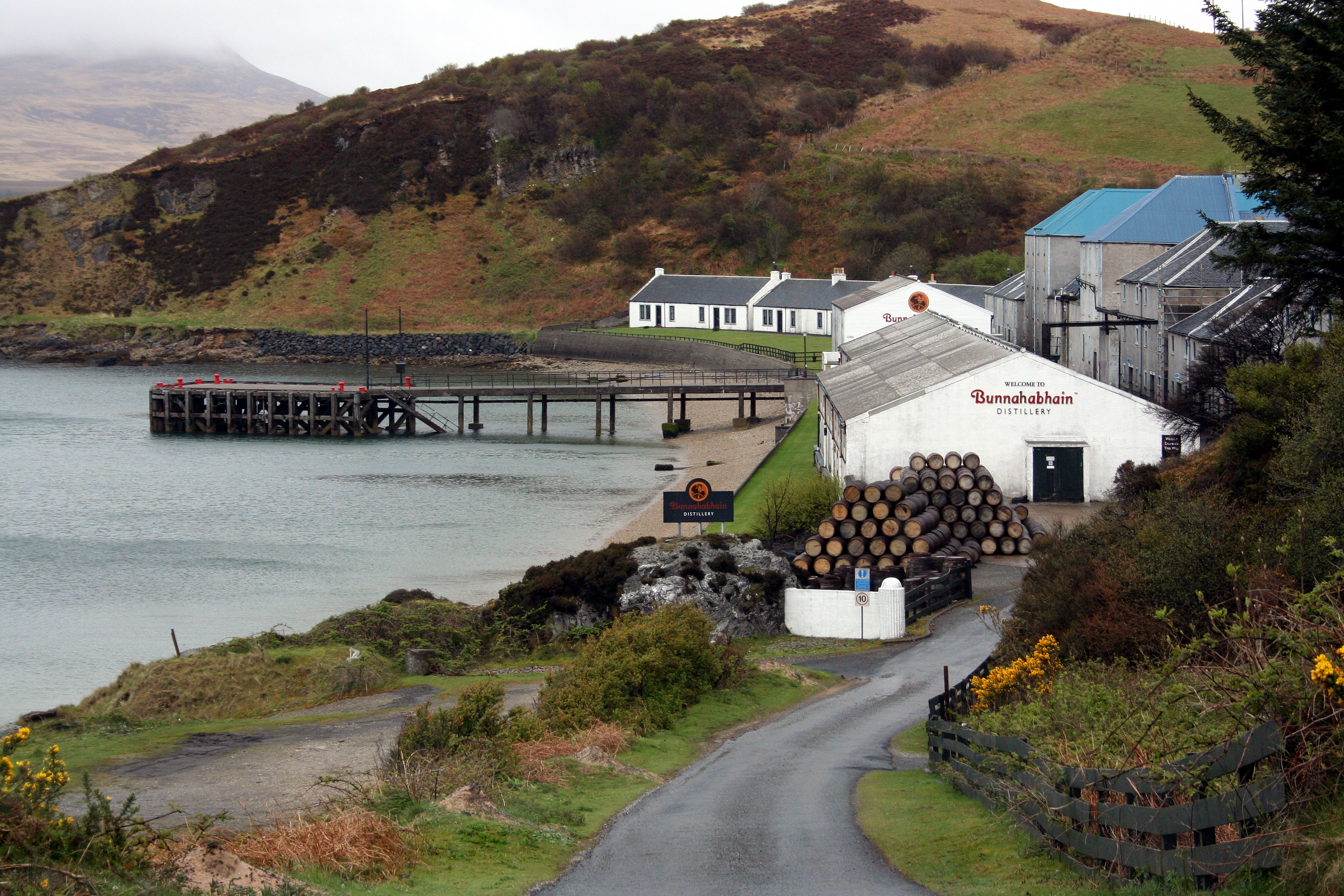
The Bunnahabhain distillery (2015)

The other distilleries on the island make whisky in a variety of styles. Bunnahabhain makes much lighter whiskies which are generally lightly peated. Bowmore, which started business in 1779, produces a whisky which is well balanced, using a medium-strong peating level (25 ppm) but also using sherry-cask maturation. The Kilchoman distillery started production in late 2005; in location it is unlike the other distilleries, which are all by the sea. The newest distillery is Ardnahoe, the island's ninth, which opened in 2019.

In general, the whiskies from this island are known for a "pungent peaty, smoky and oily flavours, with just a hint of salty sea air and seaweed" because of the use of peat and the maritime climate. The Island's own web site is more specific. Distilleries in the south make whisky which is "medium-bodied ... saturated with peat-smoke, brine and iodine" because they use malt that is heavy with peat as well as peaty water. Whisky from the northern area is milder because it is made using spring water for a "lighter flavoured, mossy (rather than peaty), with some seaweed, some nuts..." characteristic.

It is hypothesised that the Islay's whisky industry may be moving to a broader range of products, some less peaty than the current majority, including new types of whisky.

== Distilleries ==
=== Active distilleries ===
Distillery	Pronunciation^{†}	Scottish Gaelic form^{††}	Meaning of Gaelic form	Years active	Location	Ownership
Ardbeg	/ɑːrdˈbɛɡ/ ard-BEG	An Àird Bheag	small promontory	1815–1981, 1990–1996, 1997–	Ardbeg village, on the south-east coast of the island	Glenmorangie Company Ltd, a subsidiary of LVMH
Ardnahoe		àirde an t-slèibh	height of the hollow	2019–	At the road between Port Askaig and Bunnahabhain	Hunter Laing
Bowmore	/boʊˈmɔːr/ boh-MOR	Bogh Mòr	the big bend	1779–	In the town of Bowmore, the island's largest settlement on the eastern shore of Loch Indaal	Morrison Bowmore Distillers Ltd, a subsidiary of Suntory Global Spirits
Bruichladdich	/brʊxˈlædi/ bruukh-LAD-ee	Bruthach a' Chladaich	brae of the shore	1881–1995,^{‡} 2001–	Bruichladdich village, on western shore of Loch Indaal	Reopened as an independent distillery in 2001 and purchased in 2012 by Remy Cointreau
Bunnahabhain	/ˌbuːnəˈhævən/ BOO-nə-HAV-ən	Bun na h-Abhainne	mouth of the river	1880/1883–	Bunnahabhain Bay, on the north-east coast of the island	Distell Group Limited
Caol Ila	/kʌlˈiːlə/ kuul-EE-lə	Caol Ìle	The Sound (Strait) of Islay	1846–1972,^{‡} 1974–	Close to Port Askaig, on the north-east coast of the island	Diageo
Kilchoman	/kɪlˈxoʊmən/ kil-KHOH-mən	Cille Chomain	St. Comman's church	2005–	On the western side of the Rhinns of Islay, near the settlement of Kilchoman and Machir Bay	Independently owned and established in 2005 as the first new distillery on Islay since 1881
Lagavulin	/ˌlɑːkəˈvuːlɪn/ LAH-kə-VOO-lin	Lag a' Mhuilinn	the hollow of the mill	1742/1816–	Lagavulin village, on the south-east coast of the island	Diageo
Laphroaig	/ləˈfrɔɪɡ/ lə-FROYG	Laphraoig (Believed to be Gaelicised Old Norse)	slope of broad-bay	1815–	Laphroaig village, on the south-east coast of the island	Morrison Bowmore Distillers Ltd, a subsidiary of Suntory Global Spirits
Port Ellen				1825–1929, 1967–1983, 2024–	Port Ellen village, at the southern coast in Kilnaughton Bay	Diageo
^{‡} Except during the Great Depression (~1930–1937) and World War II (~1940–1945)

^{†} These reflect what are often anglicised re-spellings of Scottish Gaelic. Pronunciation of the Scottish Gaelic from which they are derived may be different.

^{††} The Scottish Gaelic from which the distillery's name was anglicised if applicable, according to Ainmean-Àite na h-Alba. Not necessarily an official name of the distillery.

=== New distilleries ===
Hunter Laing's Ardnahoe Distillery, located between Port Askaig and Bunnahabhain, opened in April 2019, becoming Islay's ninth distillery.

A new distillery at Gartbreck Farm, just south of Bowmore, was planned in 2014 by Jean Donnay of Glann ar Mor Distillery in Brittany, France, as a joint venture with Hunter Laing of Glasgow but as of December 2018 the project was stalled over a land and management dispute.

In 2020 Elixir Distillers broke ground on a new distillery, which is to be known as Portintruan, on the road between Port Ellen and Laphroaig.

=== Closed distilleries ===
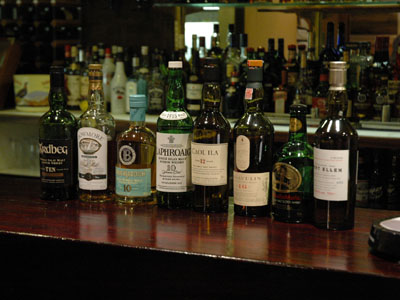
Whiskies from eight distilleries on Islay. When this photograph was taken in August 2004, one of the distilleries had ceased production.

The oldest record of a legal distillery on the island of Islay refers to Bowmore in 1779 and at one time there were up to 23 distilleries in operation. For example, Port Charlotte distillery operated from 1829 to 1929

In March 2007 Bruichladdich Distillery announced the reopening of the distillery at Port Charlotte (Port Sgioba in Gaelic), which was closed in 1929, and was also known as the Lochindaal distillery.

- Ardenistle (1837–1849) / Kildalton (1849–1852) / Islay (1852–1852), subsumed by Laphroaig 1853
- Ardmore (1817–1835), taken over by Lagavulin 1837
- Daill (1814–1830), ruins on road between Port Askaig & Bridgend
- Freeport (1847–1847), location unknown
- Kildalton (1817–1837), merged with Lagavulin
- Killarow (c. 1760–1818) / Bridgend (1818–1822), ruins in village
- Lochindaal/Port Charlotte/Rhinns (1829–1929), near Bruichladdich
- Lossit (1821) / Ballygrant (1826–1860), ruins south of the village A846
- Malt Mill (1908–1962), now part of Lagavulin
- Mulindry (1826–1827), at the junction of the Neriby Burn and the River Laggan, now in ruins
- Newton (1819–1837), ruins immediately south of A846 between Port Askaig & Bridgend
- Octomore (1816–1852), ruins near Port Charlotte
- Port Ellen (1825–1929, 1967–1983), large port village of Islay, converted to a malting. Reopened in 2024
- Scarabus (1817–1818), no evidence of production
- Tallant (1821–1852), Tallant farm south of Bowmore

== See also ==
- Outline of whisky
