= Douglas Laing & Co =

- Founded: 1948
- Headquarters: Glasgow, Scotland
- Products: Scotch whisky
- Website: www.douglaslaing.com

Douglas Laing & Co is an independent bottler of Scotch whisky. Based in Glasgow, Scotland and established in 1948, the company has a number of brands including its "Remarkable Regional Malts" range, encompassing The Epicurean, Timorous Beastie, Scallywag, Rock Island and Big Peat, as well as Old Particular, Provenance and Xtra Old Particular, which they collectively call their "Exceptional Single Casks". The firm also creates and sells King of Scots Blended Scotch Whisky, Clan Denny Single Casks and Premier Barrel.

The company is a member of the Scotch Whisky Association.

== Strathearn ==
In 2019, the company acquired Strathearn distillery in Perthshire.

== Products ==
=== Big Peat ===
Combining only Islay Malt Whisky from the Ardbeg, Port Ellen, Bowmore and the Caol Ila distilleries, Douglas Laing's Big Peat Small Batch Islay blended malt whisky or vatted malt is bottled at 46% alcohol strength. Big Peat has received plaudits worldwide including an award for Scottish Vatted Malt of the Year in Jim Murray's Whisky Bible and Blended Scotch Malt of the Year at the World Whiskies Awards 2010. A festive themed Big Peat limited edition bottling is released annually at cask strength for extra warmth during the cold winter months.

=== Scallywag ===
Launched in 2013, Scallywag is a blend of Speyside single malts, predominantly matured in Sherry butts and bottled at 46%. The packaging features a Fox Terrier in honour of the Douglas Laing family's long line of pets. Douglas Laing has also released some limited edition Scallywag products, including cask strength bottlings.

=== Timorous Beastie ===
Timorous Beastie is a Highland Blended Malt, featuring a mouse on the packaging in homage to Robert Burns' famous Scots poem, To a Mouse. A blend of Highland single malts, Timorous Beastie combines spirit from Glen Garioch, Glengoyne and Blair Athol Distilleries and is bottled at 46.8%. Since its launch in 2014, Douglas Laing has released a series of aged Timorous Beastie bottlings, including Timorous Beastie 40 Years Old.

=== Rock Island ===
Rock Island is an island blended malt scotch whisky, combining single malts distilled on Islay, Arran, Jura and Orkney. Formerly known as Rock Oyster.

=== The Epicurean ===
First released in 2016, The Epicurean is Douglas Laing's Lowland blended malt. Bottled at 46% with packaging featuring a character said to be the "1930s cheeky chappy from Glasgow".

=== Other products ===
Single Cask Malts and Grains

- Old Particular
- Xtra Old Particular
- Provenance
- King of Scots Blended Scotch Whisky
- Premier Barrel Single Malts
- Double Barrel Blended Malts

Distribution Brands

- The Glenturret Single Malt Scotch Whisky
- Syndicate Blended Scotch Whisky
