= Ardnahoe distillery =

Scotch whisky distillery on Islay, Scotland

Coordinates: 55.868985°N 6.117463°W

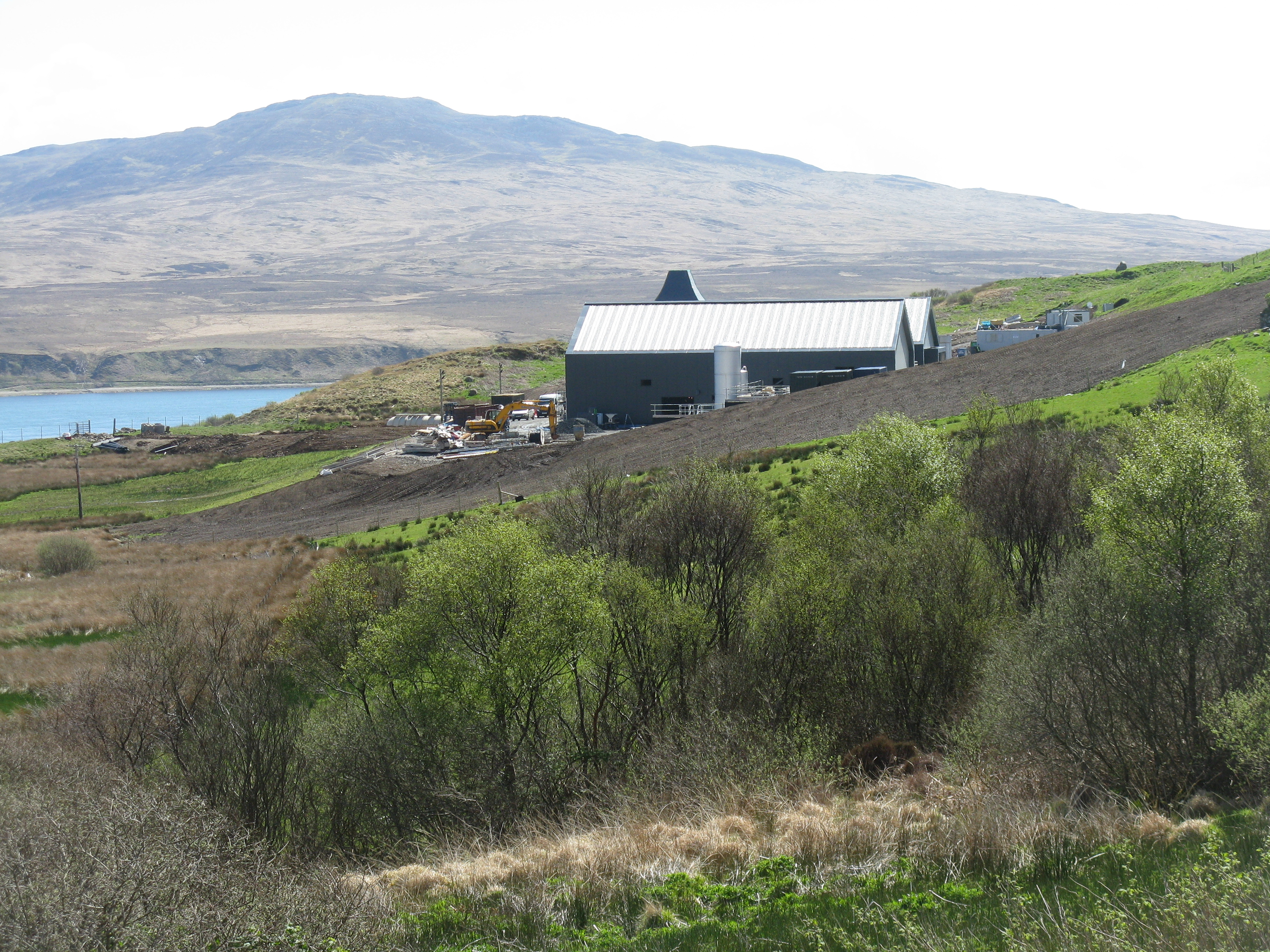
- Ardnahoe distillery

Region: Islay
- Location: Port Askaig
- Owner: Hunter Laing & Company,
- Founded: 2019
- Water source: Ardnahoe Loch
- No. of stills: 1 wash still 1 spirit still
- Capacity: 900,000 L

Ardnahoe distillery is a Scotch whisky distillery on Islay, in Scotland.

== Location ==
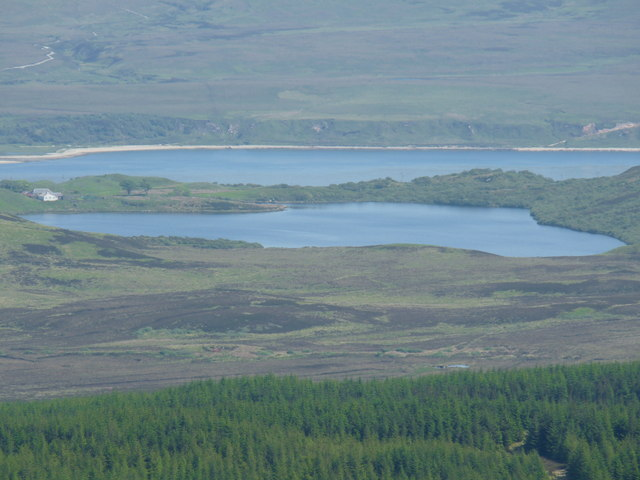
Loch Ardnahoe and the site of Ardnahoe farm in 2009 (the distillery now occupies the site in the distance).

The distillery is on the north east coast of Islay, located just north of Port Askaig, between the Caol Ila distillery and the Bunnahabhain distillery. The distillery is located between Loch Ardnahoe and the Sound of Islay (Caol Ìle, the narrow strait between Islay and Jura). The name of the distillery and lake translates as the Height of the Hollow in Gaelic.

== History ==
Plans for the distillery was submitted to Argyll and Bute Council in January 2016. By October 2017, the distillery was under construction, with the foundations completed.

The distillery opened in April 2019 and was the first new whisky distillery to open on Islay for 15 years. The distillery was opened by Lord Robertson of Port Ellen. The distillery initially was built with a £12M investment from Hunter Laing & Company, a Scottish family-owned whisky business. The site covers four acres (1.5 hectares) and the management team is led by Stewart Hunter Laing and his sons Scott and Andrew.

By November 2019, the distillery had welcomed 24,000 visitors and was awarded a five-star grading from VisitScotland.

The distillery released its first whisky in summer 2024. It is 5 years old and matured in ex-Bourbon and ex-Oloroso sherry.

== Facilities ==
The distillery includes a visitor centre with retail facilities and a whisky bar.

The distillery uses old-style worm tubs in its distillation process, which is unusual for Islay whiskies.
