= Bunnahabhain distillery =

Scotch whisky distillery on Islay, Scotland

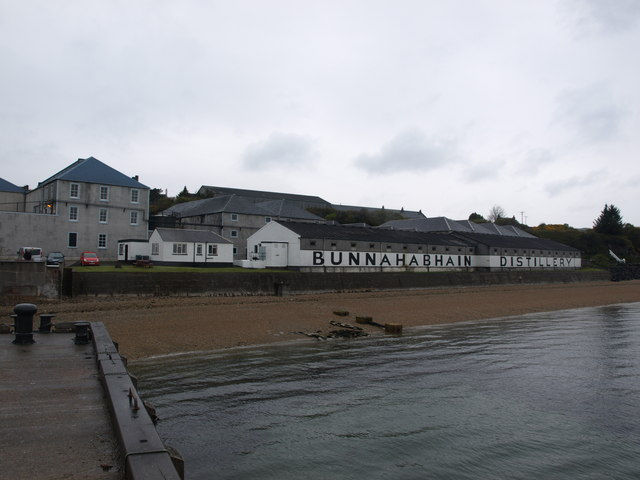

Region: Islay
- Location: Islay
- Coordinates: 55.883230°N 6.126261°W
- Owner: Distell (Heineken N.V.)
- Founded: 1881
- Status: Operational
- Water source: Margadale River
- No. of stills: 2 wash (30,000 litres); 2 spirit (15,000 litres)
- Capacity: 3,500,000 litres per annum
- Website: bunnahabhain.com

Location map
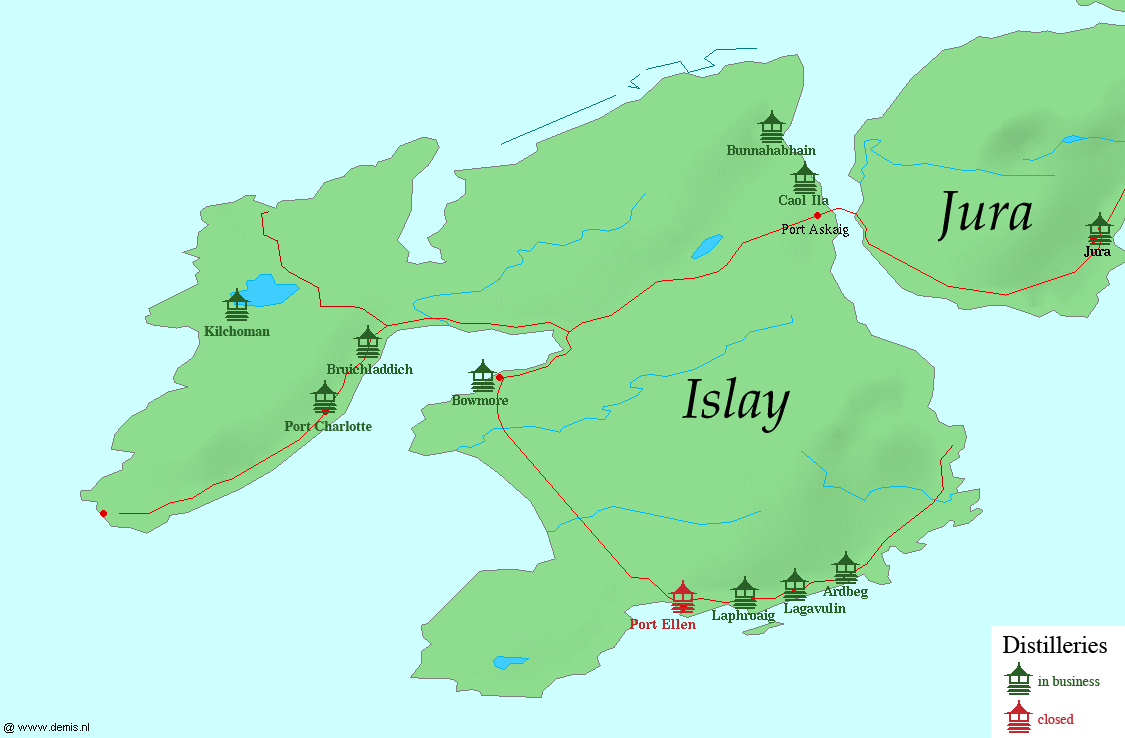

Bunnahabhain distillery (/bʊnəˈhɑːvən/; Scottish Gaelic: Taigh-staile Bun na h-Abhainne, [t̪əˈs̪t̪alə punəˈhavɪɲ]) was founded in 1881 near Port Askaig on Islay and is owned by the Scotch whisky producer Distell Group Limited a subsidiary of Heineken N.V,. The village of Bunnahabhain was founded to house its workers.

== History ==
The Bunnahabhain is one of the milder single malt Islay whiskies available and its taste varies greatly from other spirits to be found on the island of Islay, off the west coast of Scotland.

Initially the distillery was owned by the Islay Distillery Company, but in 1887 it was taken over by the Highland Distilleries Company. The earliest records of the use of electricity on Islay are from 1894 when the Bunnahabhain Distillery was provided with electric light.

Originally the distillery was supplied by ship, but in 1960 a road was built to the distillery. The last delivery by ship was in 1993. The distillery closed in 1981 but was reopened in 1984 when demand picked up. In 2003 it was acquired by Burn Stewart which merged with Distell in 2014 (later acquired by Heineken N.V.) and is one of ten active distilleries on the island.

The name Bunnahabhain is an anglicisation of Bun na h-Abhainne, Scottish Gaelic for Mouth of the River.

== Managers ==
- Mr. Grant 1886 - 1902
- James Falconer from 1902 (formerly manager of the Scapa distillery)
- Bob Gordon - late 1970s
- Douglas Eccles - there in 1985
- Sandy Lawtie - 1985 - 1989
- Hamish Proctor - 1989 - 1998
- John MacLellan - 1998 - 2009
- Andrew Brown - 2011–present

== Products ==
Bunnahabhain Distillery logo

Core products as of 2022 include:

- Bunnahabhain 12 Year Old ABV 46.3%
- Bunnahabhain 18 Year Old ABV 46.3%
- Bunnahabhain 25 Year Old ABV 46.3%
- Bunnahabhain 30 Year Old ABV 46.3%
- Bunnahabhain 40 Year Old ABV 41.9%
- Stiuireadair (/ˈstʊrətʃə/) ABV 46.3%
- Toiteach A Dhà (/ˌtoʊtʃɛx ə ˈdɑː/) ABV 46.3%

There are several independent bottler releases from these brands, including That Boutique-y Whisky Company, Douglas Laing & Co, and Duncan Taylor.

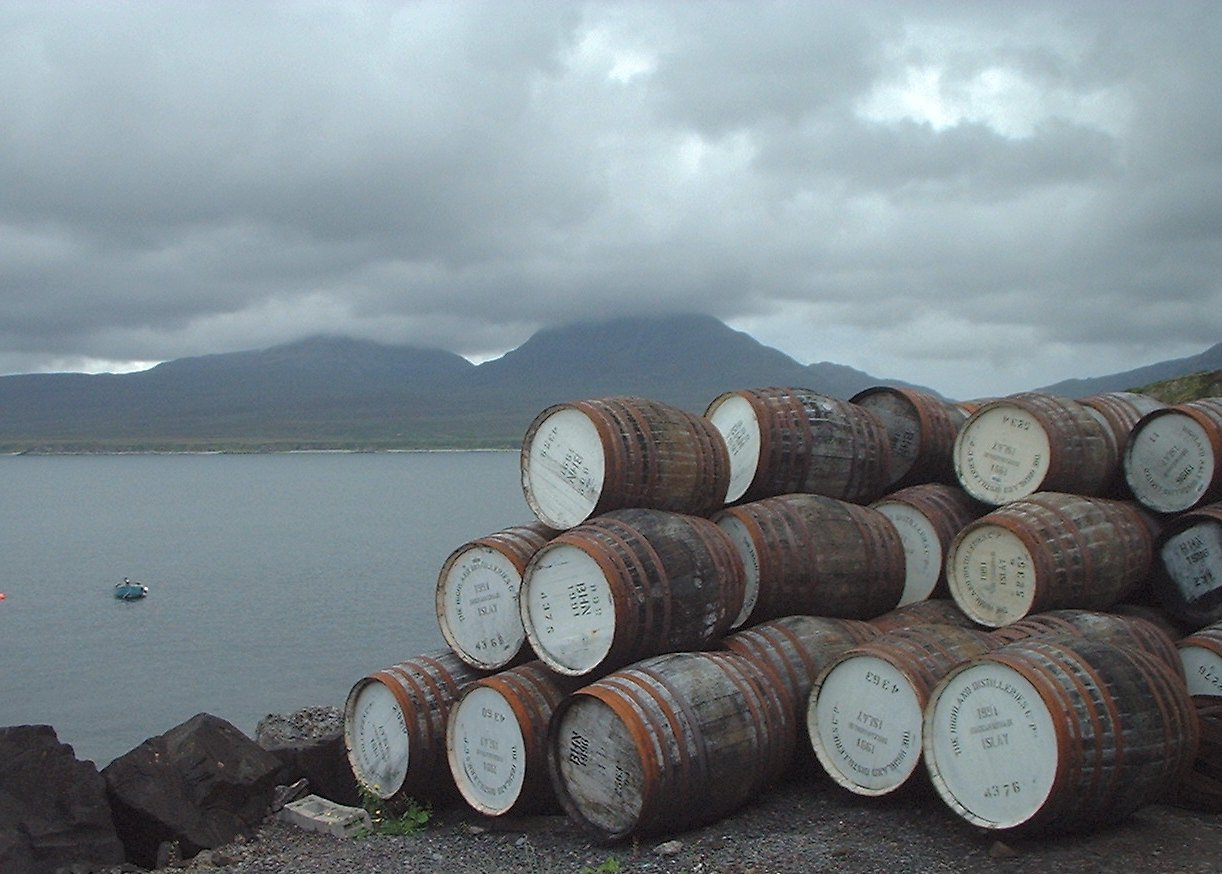
Empty casks at Bunnahabhain distillery

== See also ==
- List of distilleries in Scotland
