= Duncan Taylor =

Duncan Taylor may refer to:

- Duncan Taylor (company), a Scottish alcoholic beverages company
- Duncan Taylor (diplomat) (born 1958), British diplomat
- Duncan Taylor (rugby union) (born 1989), Scottish rugby union player
