= Margadale =

Area on the Scottish island of Islay

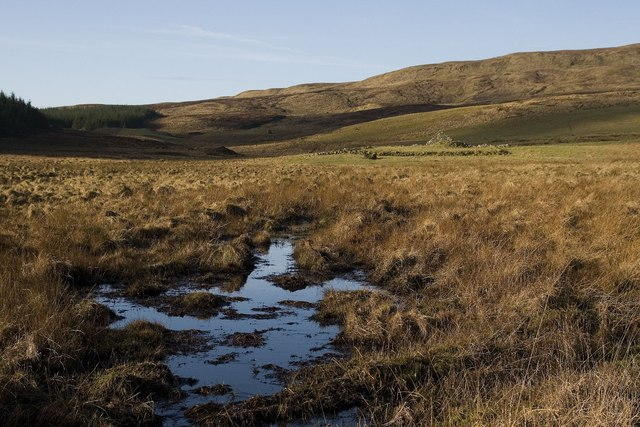
Margadale, Islay

Margadale is an area in the northeast of the island of Islay, in the Inner Hebrides of Scotland, near Bunnahabhain. Margadale Hill and Margadale River are located in this area. The area lends its name to the barony of Margadale of Islay in the County of Argyll, a title in the Peerage of the United Kingdom. The area, as well as most of Islay, is owned by Alastair Morrison.
