= Laphroaig distillery =

Scotch whisky distillery on Islay, Scotland

Coordinates: 55°37′48″N 06°09′08″W

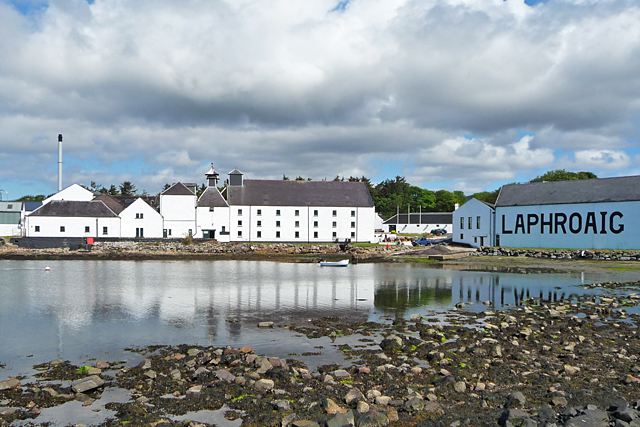

Region: Islay
- Location: Port Ellen
- Owner: Suntory Global Spirits
- Founded: 1815
- Status: Operational
- Water source: The Kilbride Dam
- No. of stills: 3 wash 4 spirit
- Capacity: 3,300,000 litres

Laphroaig
- Age(s): 10-year-old 10-year-old (cask strength); 10-year-old sherry oak finish Lore; Select; Quarter Cask; Càirdeas; 15-year-old (re-released 2015); 18-year-old (discontinued 2015); 25-year-old 27-year-old 30-year-old 32-year-old 40-year-old
- Cask type(s): American Oak Bourbon; Oak Quarter Cask; European Oak Oloroso sherry
- ABV: 40% 43% 48% 55.3%

Laphroaig distillery (/ləˈfrɔɪɡ/ lə-FROYG) is a single malt Scotch whisky distillery on Islay, Scotland. It is situated on the south coast of the island, near Port Ellen, at the head of a small bay known as Loch Laphroaig. The Lagavulin and Ardbeg distilleries are close by.

The distillery and brand are owned and operated by Suntory Global Spirits, a subsidiary of Suntory Holdings of Osaka, Japan.

== History ==
The Laphroaig distillery was established in 1815 by Donald and Alexander Johnston. The Johnstons who founded Laphroaig were from the Clan Donald and are likely to be from the MacIain of Ardnamurchan branch of the clan. The family anglicised their name to Johnston. The last member of the Johnston family to run the distillery was Ian Hunter, a nephew of Sandy Johnston, who died childless in 1954 and left the distillery to one of his managers, Bessie Williamson.

The distillery was sold to Long John International, a Scottish distiller in the 1960s. In 1973, Long John International and the distillery were acquired by Whitbread.

In 1989, the distillery was sold by Whitbread to become part of Allied Domecq. The brand was in turn acquired by Fortune Brands in 2005, as one of the brands divested by Pernod Ricard in order to obtain regulatory approval for its takeover of Allied Domecq. Laphroaig has been the only whisky to carry the Royal Warrant of the Prince of Wales, which was awarded in person during a visit to the distillery in 1994. The distillery identifies Charles by his title of Duke of Rothesay, as he is recognised in Scotland. The 15-year-old is reportedly then Prince and now King Charles' favourite whisky.

Fortune Brands split up its business product lines in 2011, forming its spirits business into Beam Inc. Beam was then purchased by Suntory Holdings in April 2014.

== Taste ==
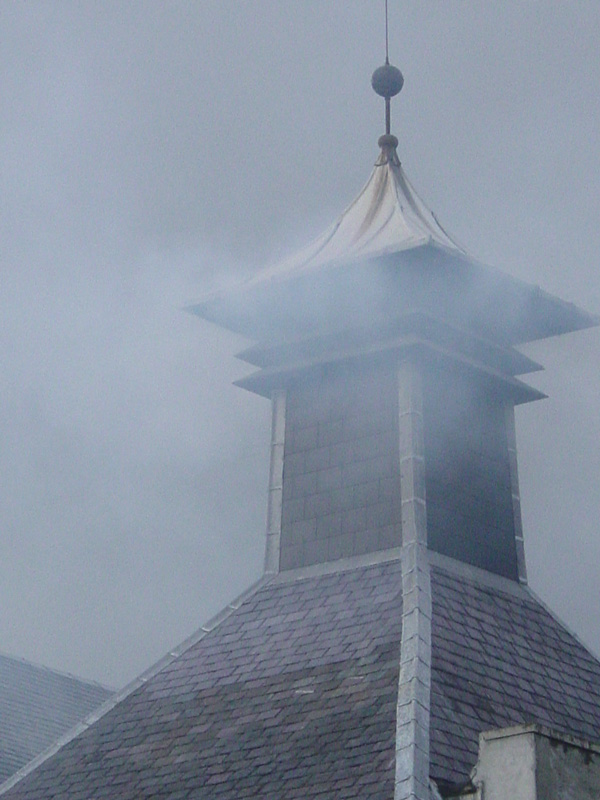
A distinctive "pagoda"-style kiln chimney at Laphroaig

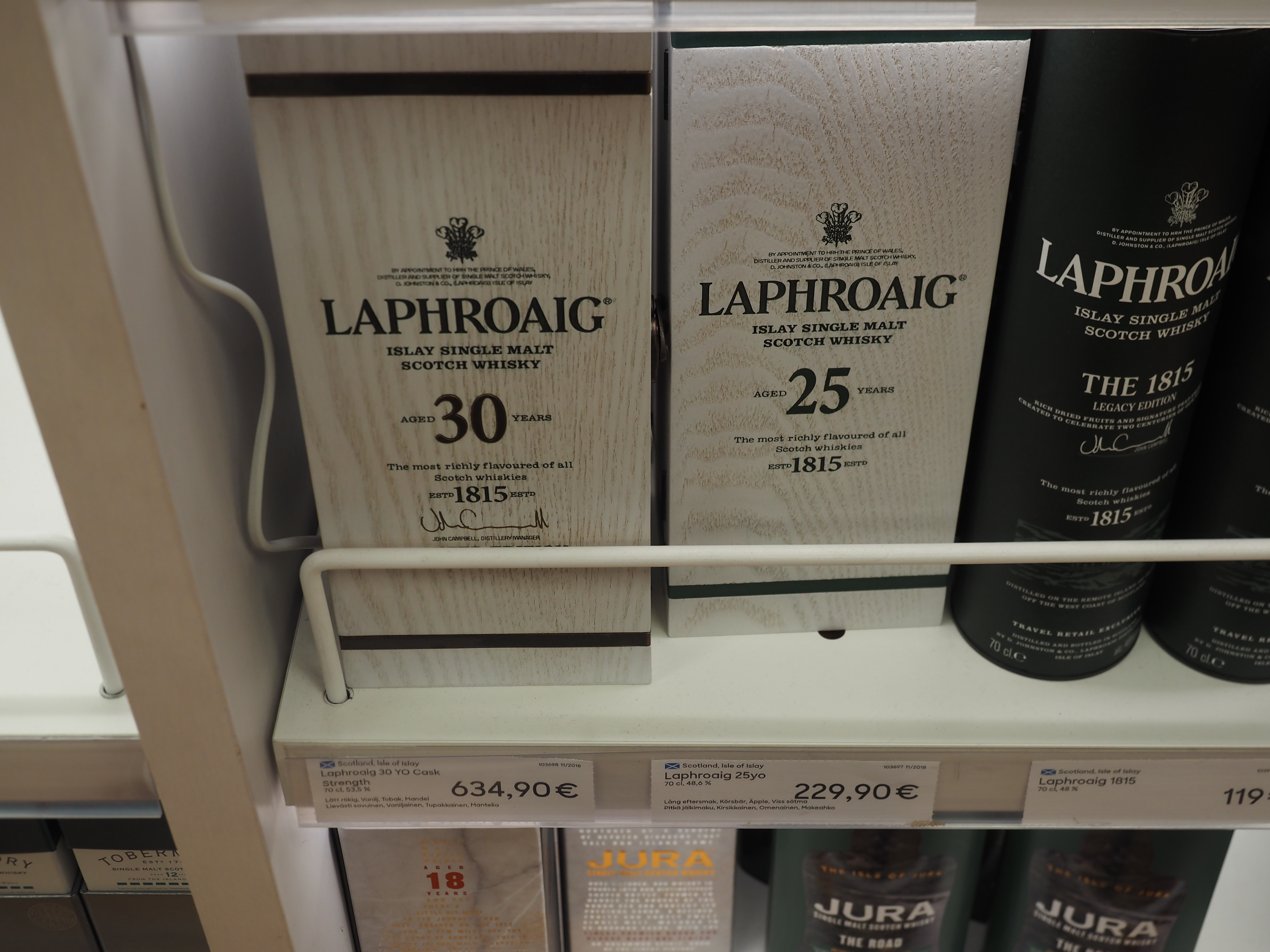
Laphroaig 30-year-old and 25-year-old belong to the distillery's most expensive products.

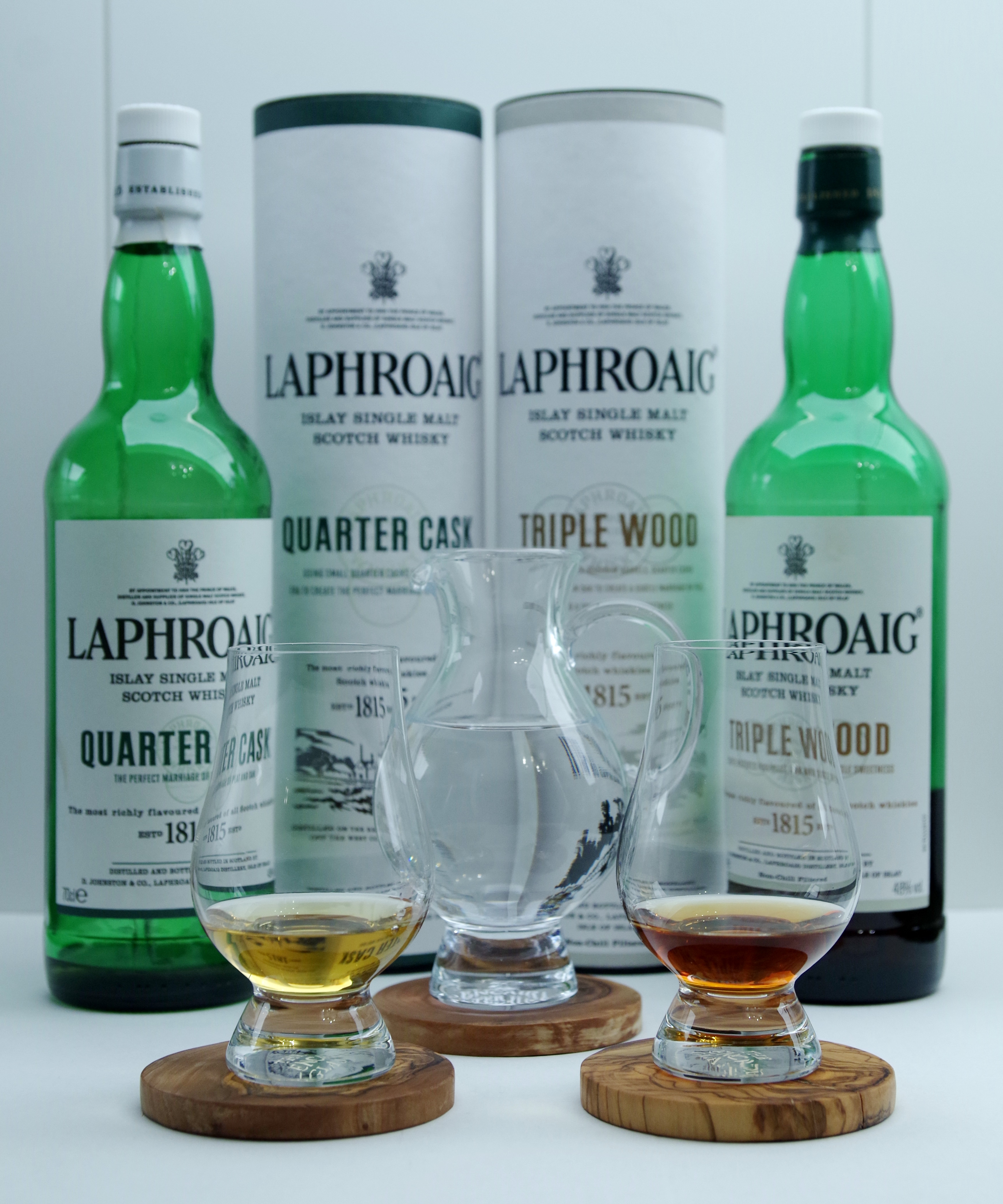
Laphroaig Quarter Cask and Triple Wood

Laphroaig calls itself "the most richly flavoured of all Scotch whiskies", and is most frequently aged to 10 years, although the 15-year-old variety is common (the 27-, 30- and 40-year-olds are rare and expensive; the 18-year-old was discontinued in late 2015). The whisky has a peaty/smoky flavour. Approximately 10% of their barley is malted on site using hand-cut peat from locations on Islay.

The Laphroaig Quarter Cask was introduced in 2004. This expression is aged in ex-bourbon barrels, is finished in smaller casks, and is not chill filtered. Due to the smaller barrels used, the oak surface contact is 30% greater than with standard barrels. The company describes the effect of this as "creating a soft and velvety edge". The Quarter Cask is bottled at 48% ABV (96 proof). The 10-year-old standard-bearer is bottled at 40% or 43% ABV, depending on the local market.

== Friends of Laphroaig ==
In 1994, the Friends of Laphroaig Club was established, members of which are granted a lifetime lease of up to 1 square foot (930 cm^{2}) per person of Laphroaig land on the island of Islay. The annual royalty from owning a plot is a dram of Laphroaig which can be obtained upon visiting the distillery. Friends of Laphroaig was revamped in 2020, from lifetime status to an annualized tier-based system starting in 2021, whereby members gained annual access to club benefits commensurate with points earned under the programme's new rules.

== Advertising ==
In early 2016, Scottish poet Elvis McGonagall began appearing in online ads, reciting his own poetry as he humorously discussed the correct pronunciation of Laphroaig whisky.

In October of 2016, comedian Andy Daly performed a 3.5 hour filibuster by reading customer reviews of Laphroaig Single Malt scotch whisky.

== Managers ==
- James A. McLennan 1919 (formerly manager of the Bowmore distillery)
- Edward Shaw 1928–32 (afterwards manager of the Glenburgie distillery)
- John MacDougall 1970–74 (afterwards manager of Tormore distillery)
- Dennis Nicol 1974–80
- Murdo Reed 1980–87 (afterwards manager of Tormore distillery)
- Colin Ross 1987–89 (formerly manager of the Ben Nevis distillery)
- Iain Henderson 1989–2002
- Robin Sheilds 2003–2005
- John Campbell 2006–2021
- Barry MacAffer 2021–2024
- George Campbell 2024-

== See also ==
- List of whisky brands
- List of distilleries in Scotland
