= Sir Peter Mackie, 1st Baronet =

Scottish whisky distiller and writer

Sir Peter Mackie Bt JP
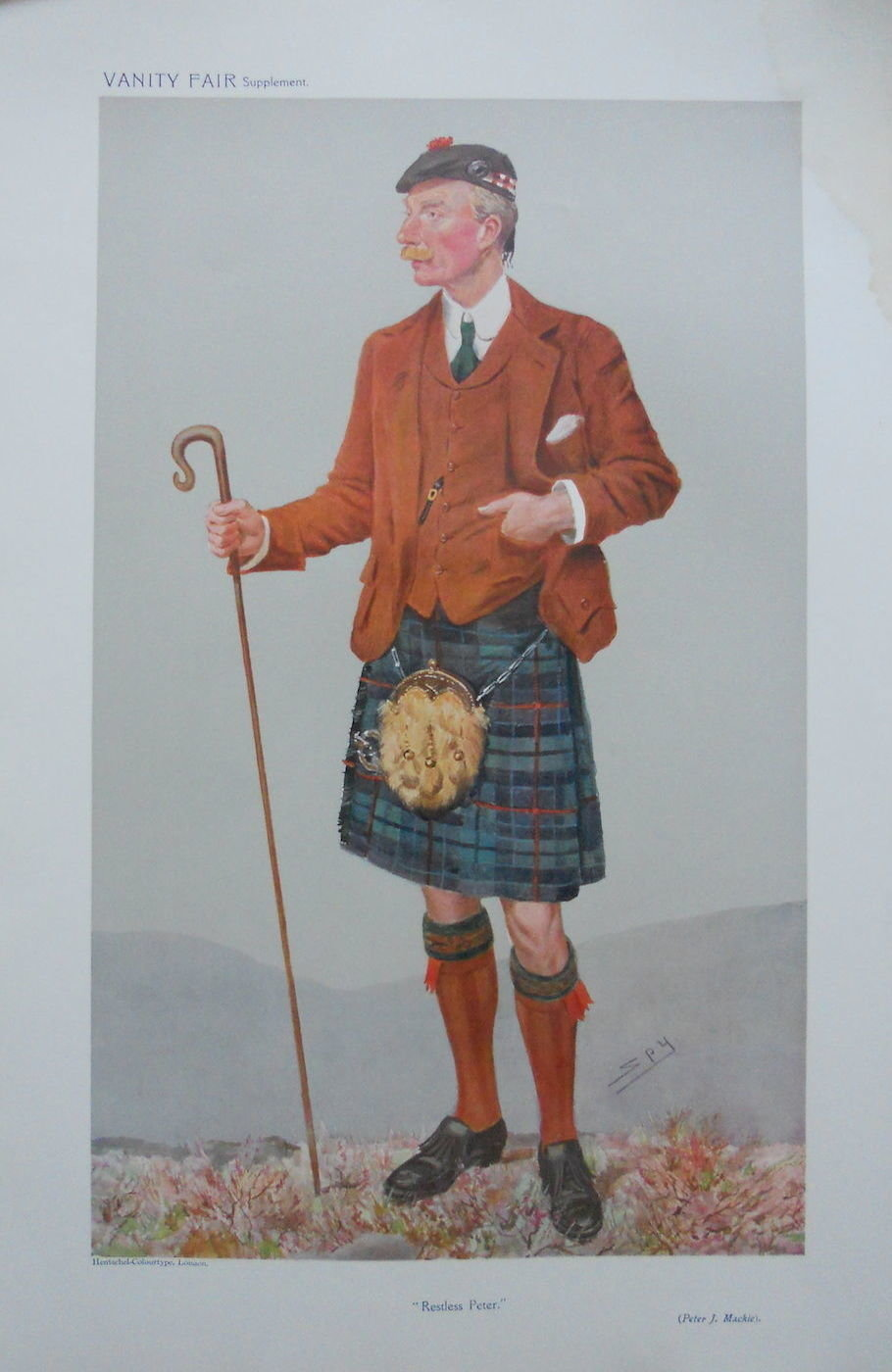
- Mackie caricatured by Spy (Leslie Ward) for Vanity Fair in 1908.

Chairman of the Scottish Unionist Association
- In office 1922 – 22 September 1924

Chairman of Mackie & Co (Distillers)
- In office 1895 – 22 September 1924

Personal details
- Born: Peter Jeffrey Mackie; 26 November 1855 St Ninians, Stirling, Scotland
- Died: 24 September 1924 (aged 68) Corraith, Symington, Ayrshire, Scotland

Sir Peter Jeffrey Mackie, 1st Baronet (26 November 1855 – 22 September 1924) was a Scottish whisky distiller, writer and landowner, best known for his role in developing the White Horse blended Scotch and for his activities in Conservative and Unionist politics.

He chaired the Glasgow-based firm Mackie & Co (Distillers), later White Horse Distillers Ltd, and served as chairman of the Scottish Unionist Association from 1922 until his death.

== Early life and education ==
Mackie was born at St Ninians, Stirling. His father, Alexander Mackie (died 1884), was a distiller. His mother was Jane Simpson Brown (died 1886).

He was educated at Stirling High School and in 1878 joined his uncle's firm, James L. Mackie & Co, at the Lagavulin distillery on Islay.

== Career ==
In 1878 Mackie joined his uncle James L. Mackie's firm, James L. Mackie & Co, at the Lagavulin distillery on Islay.

In the mid-1880s, he became a founding partner in Mackie & Co, which was established to market Lagavulin and other whiskies in London. In 1890, the two businesses amalgamated as Mackie & Co (Distillers) and began to blend White Horse. In 1895, Mackie's became a limited company and Peter Mackie became chairman, a post he held until his death. In 1924, the firm was renamed White Horse Distillers Ltd and became a public company.

Mackie travelled and wrote extensively on politics, especially on tariff reform and Imperial Federation. In 1918 he made a gift of pedigree cattle to Rhodesia to encourage ranching and cattle breeding. He also financed the Mackie Anthropological Expedition to Uganda. He was also a major landowner (owning 12,000 acres (49 km^{2}) in Argyllshire), a Justice of the Peace for Argyllshire, Ayrshire and Lanarkshire, and an active member of the Scottish Unionist Association, serving as chairman from 1922.

He was created a baronet in the 1920 Birthday Honours.

He died at his estate at Corraith on 22 September 1924, aged 68. He left no heir.

Baronetage of the United Kingdom
New creation	Baronet (of Corraith); 1920–1924	Extinct
