= Strathearn distillery =

Whisky distillery near Methven, Scotland

Coordinates: 56°23′46.73″N 3°37′14.57″W

Region: Highland
- Location: Methven
- Owner: Douglas Laing & Co
- Founded: 2013; 13 years ago
- No. of stills: 1 wash still; 1 spirit still
- Website: www.strathearndistillery.com

Strathearn is a single malt Scotch whisky and gin distillery near Methven in Scotland.

== History ==
The distillery commenced production in 2013 under the ownership of Tony Reeman-Clark, David Lang and David Wight. Initially the distillery produced gin and the first whisky was distilled in October 2013. Strathearn's first scotch whisky was released in 2016.

In 2019, the distillery was acquired by the Glasgow company Douglas Laing & Co. The new owner doubled the distillery's production capacity. A first single malt under the new ownership, The Heart, was released in 2022.

== Distillery ==
The distillery was built within a 160-year-old stone farm steading. The location was the site of an early distillery founded by William White in 1798 that became disused. The distillery has a stainless steel mash tun, two stainless steel washbacks and two stills. The stills are of an alembic type and made in Portugal by the company Hoga, having been originally designed for the Portuguese Sherry industry.

Sometimes tagged "probably Scotland’s smallest distillery", Strathearn's distillery is only composed of small 50-liter casks.

The water for the whisky comes from nearby Loch Turret.

The distillery does not offer tours.

== Products ==
The author Charles Maclean states that the distillery has probably the longest fermentation time of any distillery at 96 hours. The first whisky was released in 2017.

The distillery also produces gin. Originally, these included a Classic gin, a Citrus gin, a Heather Rose gin and an Oaked Highland gin. The brand names Strathearn Gin and Heather Rose Gin remained under ownership of the previous directors when Douglas Laing acquired the distillery and malt.

In 2025, Douglas Laing began production of their own Teasmith gin at Strathearn. The gin is flavoured by steeping the spirit with Sri Lankan tea leaves.

The distillery also blends honey for a honey based whisky.
