= Port Charlotte distillery =

Scotch whisky distillery on Islay, Scotland

Port Charlotte
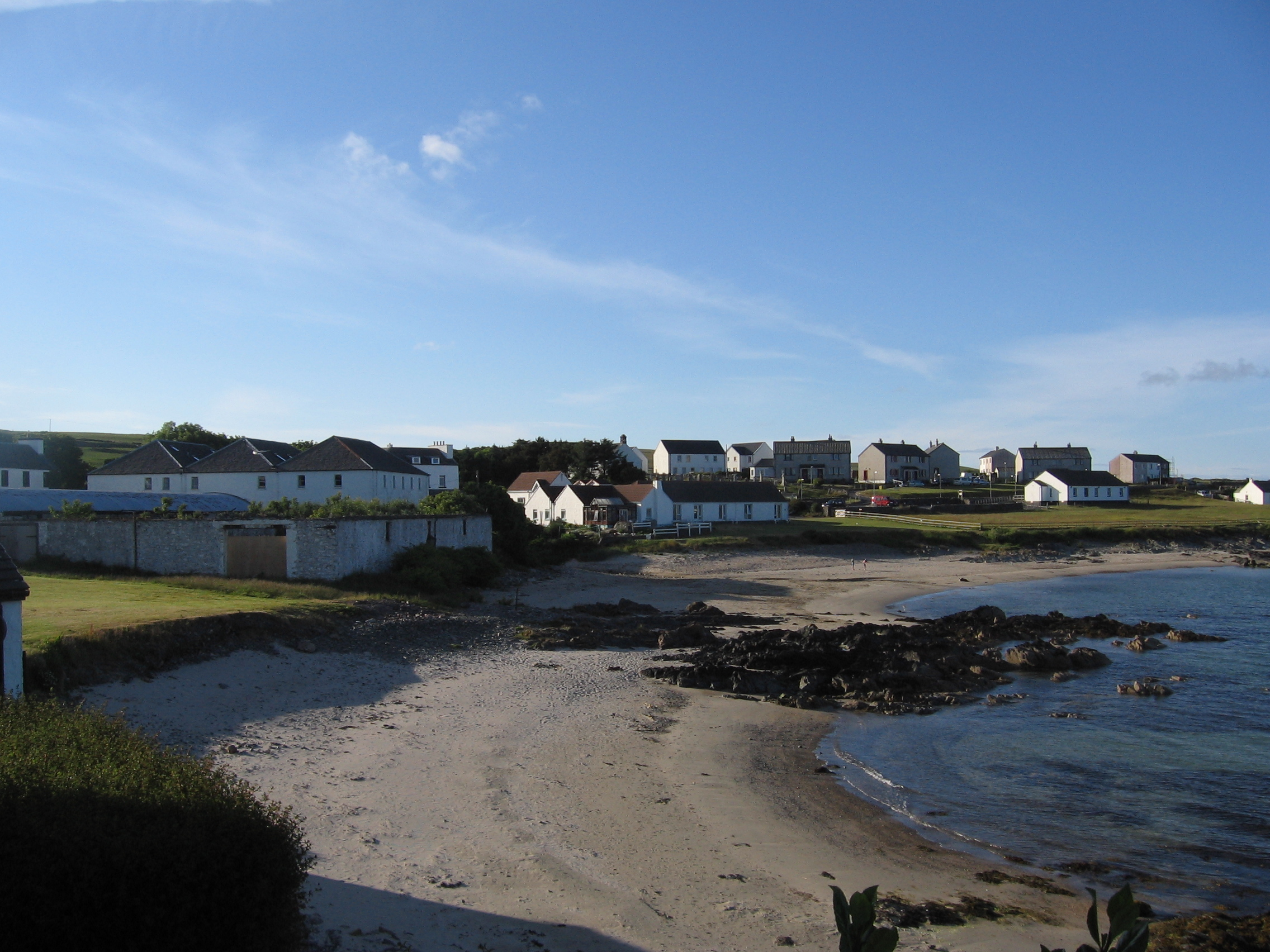
- Location: Islay
- Coordinates: 55°44′23″N 6°22′42″W
- Owner: The Bruichladdich Distillery Co. Ltd
- Founded: 1829
- Status: Converted into a whisky warehouse facility
- Mothballed: 1929-2009

Location map
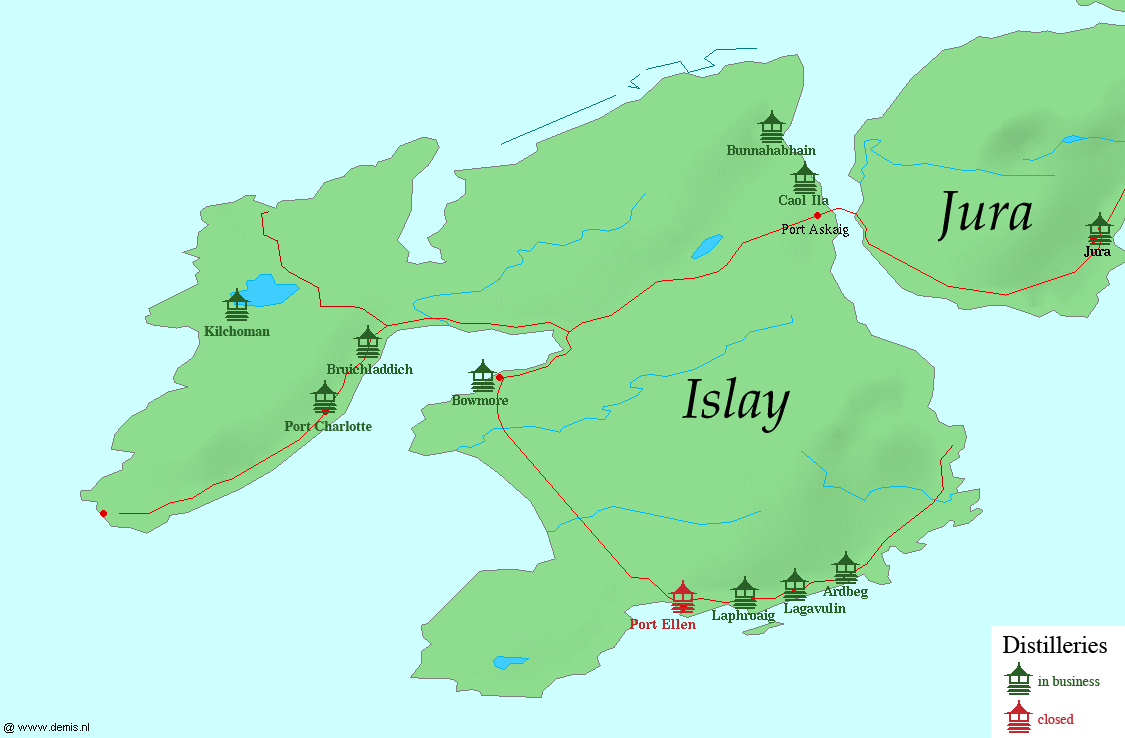

Port Charlotte distillery (also known as Rhins distillery and Lochindaal distillery) is an inactive Islay single malt Scotch whisky distillery on the island of Islay, off the west coast of Scotland.

The distillery is based in the village of Port Charlotte 3 kilometres (2 miles) southwest from the Bruichladdich distillery.

== History ==
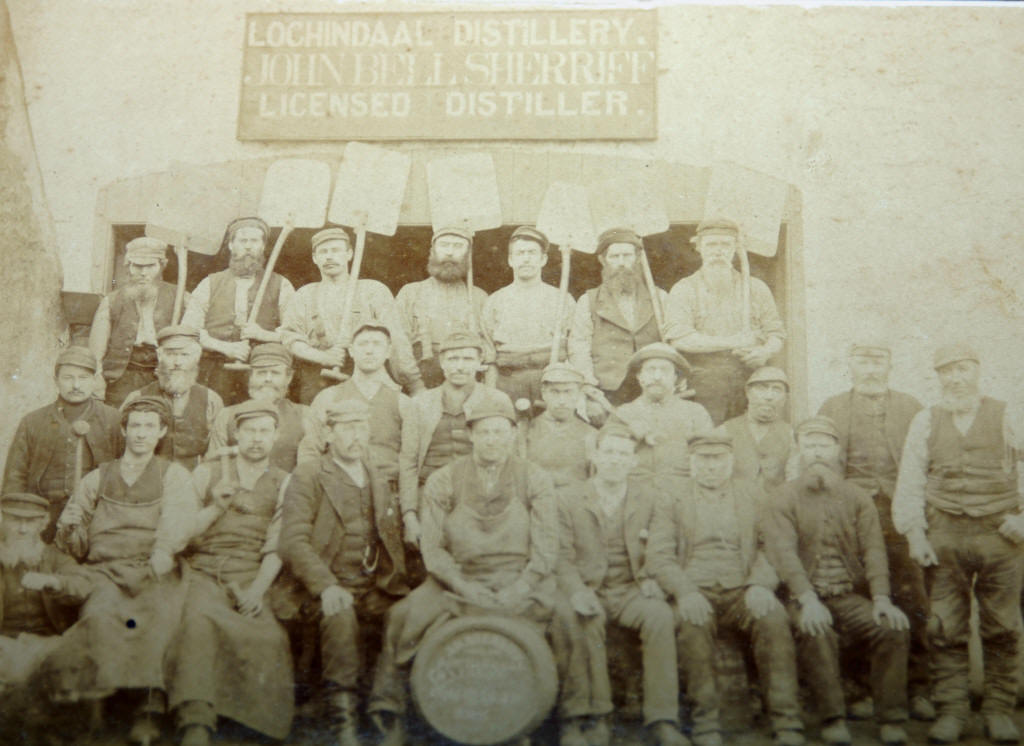
Employees of the distillery in the 2nd half of the 19th century

Port Charlotte Distillery was a purpose-built distillery, founded in 1829 when it was operated by Colin Campbell. In 1831 McLennan & Grant took over for 1 year. George McLennan continued until 1835 when he was declared bankrupt. It was then operated by Walter Graham around 1837. Later the distillery was owned by Hector Henderson and James Lamont of Henderson, Lamont and Company until 1852 when they went bankrupt. The lease was sold on with 29 years left for £750. It then operated as the Rhins Distillery & company with John McLennan in charge until 1855.

On 18 May 1861 a fire broke out in the kiln at the distillery which resulted in the destruction of the kiln and about 20 bushels of malt. The villagers managed to extinguish the fire before the rest of the distillery was damaged.

In 1864 the Inland Revenue officer, Francis Gill, who was stationed at the distillery was found drowned on 5 September in Laggan Bay.

From 1855 the distillery was operated by John Bell Sheriff of Glasgow and from 1895 J.B. Sherrif & Co Ltd until 1921. In 1921 it was acquired by Benmore Distilleries Limited which was taken over in 1929 by the Distillery Company Ltd. This resulted in the closure of the distillery.

=== Revival ===
In 2007, Diageo sold the inactive Port Charlotte distillery buildings and contents to The Bruichladdich Distillery Co. Ltd. and the Port Charlotte brand has been revived, although the distillery as such remained closed. Whisky distilled at nearby Bruichladdich distillery is matured in oak casks at Port Charlotte warehouses. Whiskies currently matured there include:

- Port Charlotte Scottish Barley, ABV 50%.
- PC 11 Heavily peated, ABV 59.8%.
