= Bessie Williamson =

Scottish distillery owner (1910–1982)

- Born: Elizabeth Leitch Williamson; Glasgow, Scotland
- Died: 26 May 1982 (aged 71); Glasgow, Scotland
- Education: University of Glasgow
- Occupations: business woman owner of Laphroaig whisky distillery
- Years active: 1954-1972 (owner of Laphroaig distillery)
- Known for: the only woman to own and manage a Scotch whisky distillery in the 20th century
- Spouse: Wishart Neil Munro Campbell
- Parents: John Williamson (father); Agnes Whyte Paton (mother)

Elizabeth Leitch Williamson (22 August 1910 – 26 May 1982) was a Scottish distillery manager and former owner of the Laphroaig distillery noted for being the second woman to manage a Scotch whisky distillery, and the first during the 20th century. She is credited as being instrumental in promoting single malt whisky, in particular Islay malts and Laphroaig, during the then-emerging US trend for single malts.

== Biography ==
Williamson was born in Glasgow in 1910 the second child of Agnes Whyte (née Paton) and John Williamson, a mercantile clerk. In World War I her father was a gunner with the Royal Garrison Artillery, and died in France in 1918. She attended the University of Glasgow from 1927, intending to become a teacher, graduating with an MA in 1932. While waiting to enrol at Jordanhill College of Education she worked as an office assistant with her uncle William Paton, an accountant working for the restaurateurs and purveyors Smith (Glasgow) Ltd.

In 1934, Williamson took a summer job as a shorthand typist at Laphroaig distillery, on Islay, intending to stay a few months. She worked directly with then owner Ian Hunter, and eventually became office manager. When Hunter suffered a stroke in 1938, Williamson took on responsibility for distribution to the United States. By the time of World War II she had become the full-time manager of the distillery.

With operations mothballed during the war and the government seeking to use the distillery for storage and training purposes, Williamson succeeded in preventing the theft of stock or damage to equipment that had occurred at other distilleries such as Old Bushmills Distillery in Dublin and could have hampered recovery of production in the postwar period. Over 400 tonnes of ammunition were stored at the facility during the early years of her tenure.

After production restarted following the war, Williamson continued to pursue the blending sales that had been the backbone of Laphroaig's business model beforehand, but starting to guide the business elsewhere. Upon Hunter's death in 1954, Williamson inherited the controlling interest in the Laphroaig distillery on Islay, Hunter's house Ardenistiel, and the island of Texa. Williamson is credited with being among the first to anticipate the coming trend for single malt scotches and to position the Laphroaig product, and by extension other Islay malts, to the American market. Williamson was quoted on UK television in the 1960s saying "The secret of Islay whiskies is the peaty water and the peat ... there's an increasing demand for the [single] Islay whiskies. We can't supply the demand that we have for our whiskies."

The Scotch Whisky Association named Williamson as its American spokesperson from 1961 to 1964 and she toured the United States representing Islay whisky to buyers and distributors. While visiting the US she met her future husband, the singer and entertainer Wishart Campbell and they married in 1961.

In 1962 Williamson sold a third of her business shares to Seager Evans and Co. The balance of ownership was released in 1967 to Long John Distilleries. Williamson continued as managing director of the distillery until her retirement in 1972. Long John International was acquired by Whitbread & Co in 1975 and sold to Allied Lyons, now Allied Domecq, in 1990. Fortune Brands split up its business product lines in 2011, forming its spirits business into Beam Inc. Beam was purchased by Suntory in April 2014.

Williamson died at Gartnavel General Hospital in Glasgow on 26 May 1982.
