= Lagavulin distillery =

Scotch whisky distillery on Islay, Scotland

Coordinates: 55°38′07.8″N 6°07′34.3″W

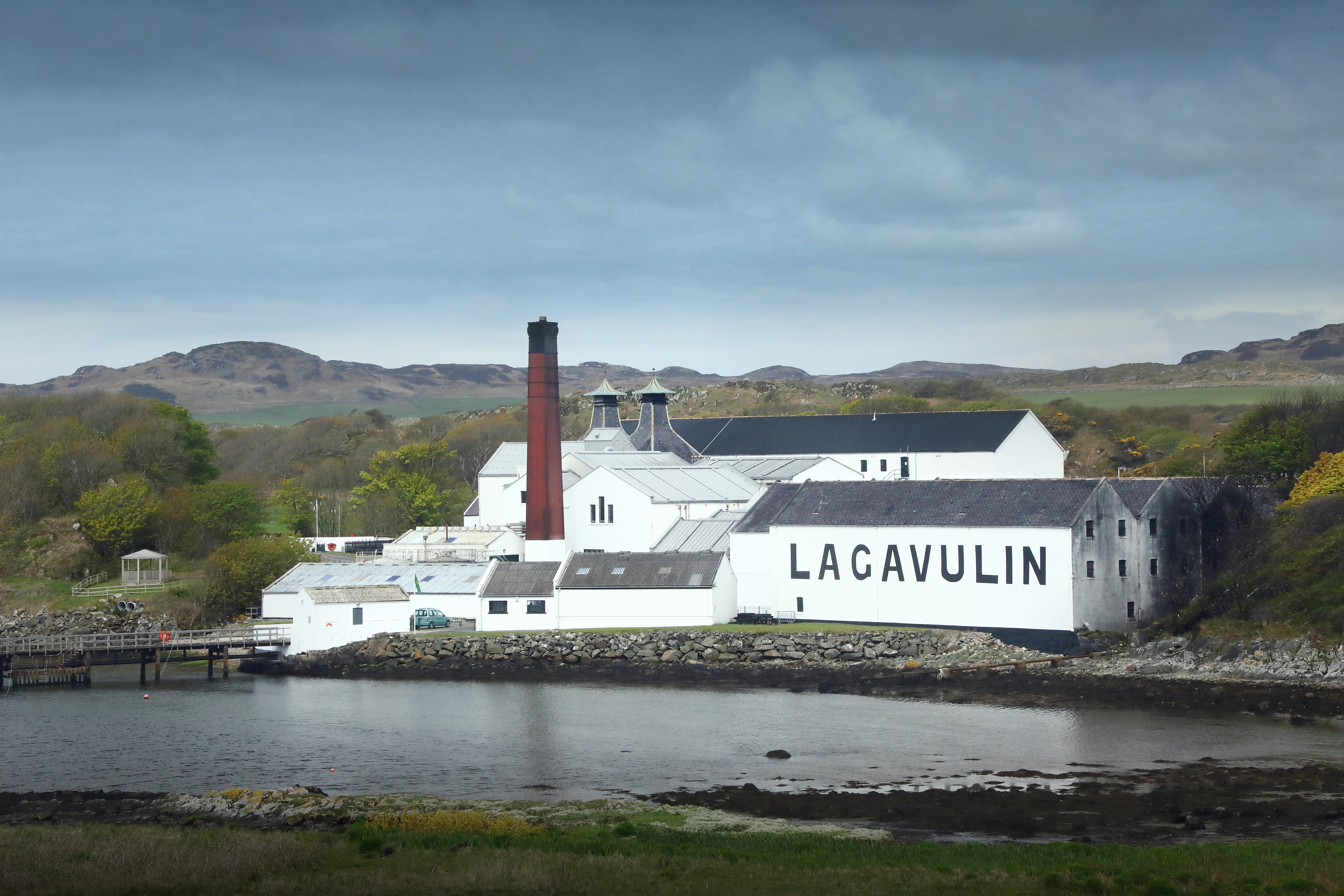

Region: Islay
- Location: Islay
- Owner: Diageo
- Founded: 1816
- Status: Operational
- Water source: Solum Lochs
- No. of stills: 2 wash stills (11,000 L); 2 spirit stills (12,500 L)
- Capacity: 1,400,000 L
- Website: www.malts.com/en-gb/brands/lagavulin

Lagavulin
- Age(s): 8-year-old 12-year-old (cask strength); 16-year-old Distiller's edition 21-year-old 25-year-old 30-year-old 37-year-old Offerman edition (11-year-old)
- Cask type(s): Bourbon; Sherry

Location map
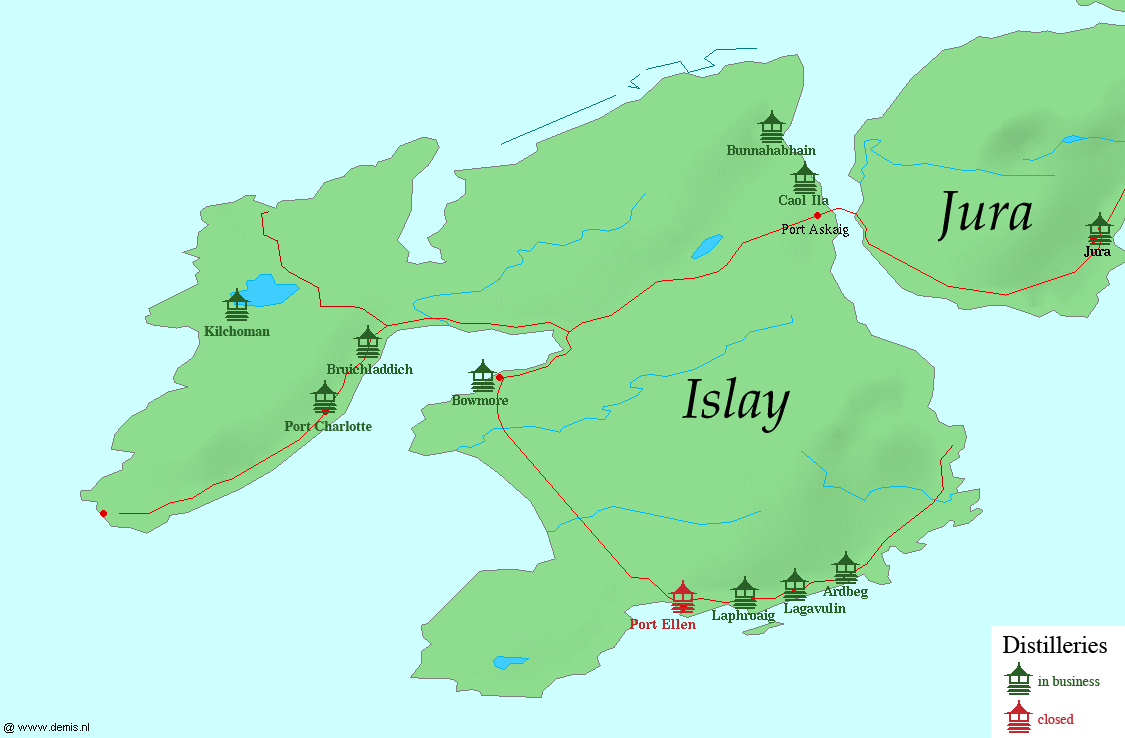

Lagavulin distillery is an Islay single malt Scotch whisky distillery located in the village of Lagavulin on the south of the island of Islay, Scotland.

Lagavulin is owned by Diageo, a multinational beverage alcohol company headquartered in London. It was previously marketed under the Classic Malts range of single malts, which is now defunct.

The standard bottling is a 16-year-old, bottled at 43% ABV. They also bottle a Distiller's edition, finished in Pedro Ximénez Sherry casks. Alongside these, they regularly release a 12-year-old cask strength version and various older and rarer expressions.

The name Lagavulin is an anglicisation of Lag a' Mhuilinn, the Scottish Gaelic for hollow of the mill.

== History ==
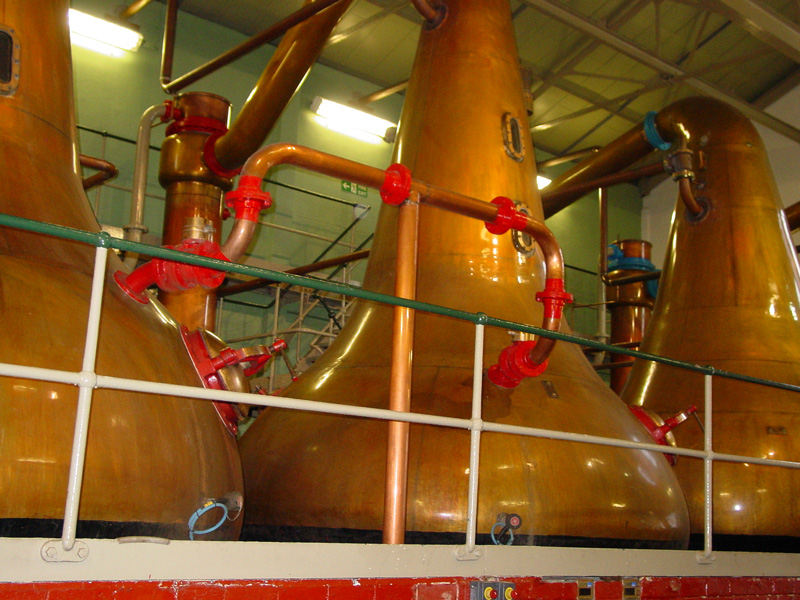
Pot stills at Lagavulin Distillery

The distillery of Lagavulin officially dates from 1816, when John Johnston and Archibald Campbell Brooks constructed two distilleries on the site. One of them became Lagavulin, taking over the other—which one is not exactly known. Records show illicit distillation in at least ten illegal distilleries on the site as far back as 1742, however.

The distillery was run by John Johnston until 1835 at which point the distillery had a valuation of £1,103 9s 8d. (equivalent to £121,200 in 2025). It was taken over by Alexander Graham who installed his son Walter Graham as the distiller. Walter ran it until 1848 when he moved to Laphroaig and presumably his brother John Crawford Graham took charge. In 1849 improvements were carried out to extend the buildings and provide new roads and access. Later John Crawford Graham entered into a partnership with James Logan Mackie. John Crowford had other business interested in Glasgow and gradually lessened his direct influence over the distillery which left James Logan Mackie in charge from 1856. In 1878 Peter Mackie joined his uncle's firm and in the mid-1880s, they established Mackie & Co. to market Lagavulin and other whiskies in London and further afield. Several legal battles ensued with their neighbour Laphroaig, brought about after the distiller at Lagavulin, Peter Mackie, leased the Laphroaig distillery. It is said that Mackie attempted to copy Laphroaig's style. Since the water and peat at Lagavulin's premises was different from that at Laphroaig's, the result did not match. Peter Mackie took over as sole partner in 1889. In 1895 the two businesses amalgamated as Mackie & Co (Distillers) and began to blend White Horse using whisky from Lagavulin. In 1895, Mackie's became a limited company. Peter was in charge until 1902 by which time he was in partnership with Andrew Hair Holm. The partnership held a lease of Lagavulin for £800 per year for 50 years.

The White Horse brand became well known for its quality and won many awards. In 1908 Mackie and Co were honoured by Royal Warrant Appointment as purveyors of White Horse whisky to King Edward VII.

In the early 1920s the distillery was sold off by Iain Ramsay to Peter Mackie for £16,000 (equivalent to £618,300 in 2025). In 1923 the firm was acquired by Buchanan Dewar Ltd who continued with the White Horse brand. The company joined Distillers Company in 1925.

Distillers Company was acquired by Guinness in 1986. Guinness merged with Grand Metropolitan to form Diageo in 1997.

== Production ==
Lagavulin is known for its producer's use of a slow distillation speed and pear shaped pot stills. The two wash stills have a capacity of 11,000 litres (2,400 imp gal; 2,900 US gal) and the two spirit stills of 12,500 litres (2,700 imp gal; 3,300 US gal) each.

== Managers ==
- Duncan MacMillan ca. 1848 - 1898
- Henry Allan ca. 1902 ca. 1914
- Murdoch McEwan 1925–1945
- Donald McDonald ca. 1966
- Jack Wilson circa 1974
- Neil Gillies, 1975–1980
- Ian Marland, 1980–1983
- Alistair Robertson, 1984–1988
- Grant Carmichael, 1988–1995
- Mike Nicolson, 1995–October 1998
- Donald Renwick, 1998–2005
- John Thomson, 2005–2006
- Graham Logie, 2006–2008
- Peter Campbell, 2008–2010
- Georgie Crawford, 2010–2018
- Colin Gordon, 2018–2020
- Pierrick Guillaume, 2020–2022
- Jordan Paisley, 2022–

== Accolades ==
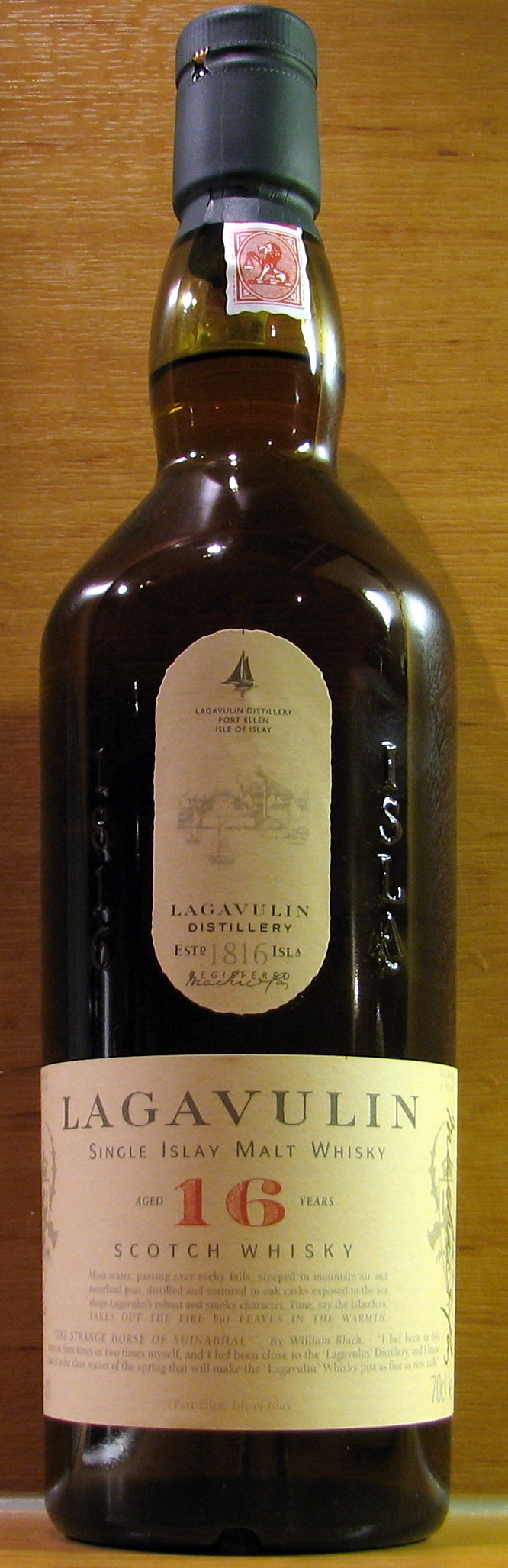
The benchmark Lagavulin 16 year old

International spirits ratings competitions have generally given Lagavulin's 16-year spirit extremely high scores. The San Francisco World Spirits Competition, for instance, gave the 16-year four consecutive double gold medals between 2005 and 2008 and has awarded it gold medals in the years since. Wine Enthusiast Magazine put the 16-year in its 90–95 point interval in 2004. Spirits ratings aggregator proof66.com, which averages scores from the San Francisco Spirits Competition, Wine Enthusiast, and others, classifies the spirit in its highest ("Tier 1") performance category.

== Cultural references ==
- Michael Schur, co-creator of NBC's Parks and Recreation made Lagavulin the drink of choice of character Ron Swanson (Nick Offerman), featuring it throughout the series.
  - The Lagavulin distillery was featured in the two-part opening episode of the show's sixth season, titled "London."
  - 51 % of The Lagavulin distillery was bought by Ron Swanson in the last episode of the show's seventh season, titled "One Last Ride."
  - Following the series, Offerman appeared in several commercials for the product and Lagavulin issued an Offerman edition.
- In The West Wing (season 3, episode 15, titled 'Dead Irish Writers'), Lagavulin was featured as the drink of choice of Lord John Marbury (Roger Rees).
- Lagavulin 16 was offered to the character Lionel Toussaint (Leslie Odom Jr.) as his preferred drink in Glass Onion: A Knives Out Mystery.
- Lagavulin is mentioned as the preferred drink of DC Comics supervillain Lex Luthor in the series finale of Titans.
- Lagavulin is mentioned as the favorite scotch of Bruno Correges, the title character in Martin Walker's "Bruno, Chief of Police" mystery novels.
- Lagavulin is ordered by Lisbeth Salander in a bar in Gibraltar near the end of the book, The Girl Who Kicked The Hornets' Nest. She tastes it, then asks for something that could not be used to tar a boat and returns to Tullamore Dew.
- A glass of Lagavulin is purchased by Chrisjen Avasarala for Admiral Souther in Season 2, Episode 2 of The Expanse. She does so by turning to the bartender and saying "get him a proper Scotch please, Lagavulin." This means that Lagavulin remains a high-end Scotch at least until the year 2350.
- In The Rose Well Files by David Luddington, Lagavulin whisky is used to entice Wilderness Jack into unknowingly participating in a scheme to stage fake alien spaceship sightings over the Rose Well Holiday Park as part of a plan to increase public interest and boost bookings.
- In the card-based videogame Slay the Spire, Lagavulin was used as a placeholder name for one of the elite enemies encounterable in the game, and is still used as its official name.
- In 2009 film Friday the 13th, Chewie (Aaron Yoo) drinks from a bottle of Lagavulin.

== See also ==
- List of whisky brands
- List of whisky distilleries in Scotland
