= Caol Ila distillery =

Scotch whisky distillery on Islay, Scotland

Coordinates: 55°51′16″N 6°06′34″W

Caol Ila
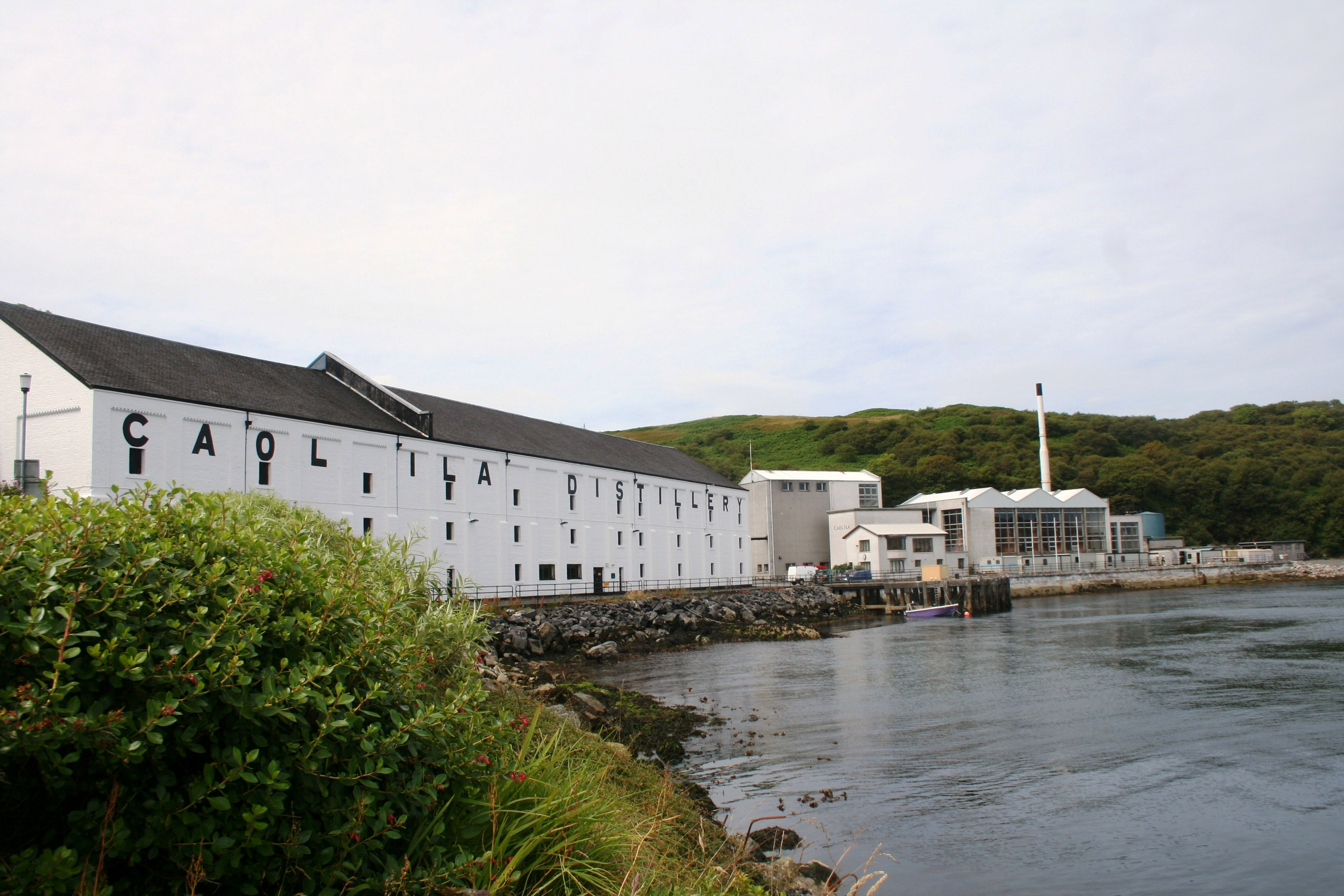

Region: Islay
- Location: Port Askaig
- Owner: Diageo
- Founded: 1846
- Status: Operational
- Water source: Loch nam Ban
- No. of stills: 3 wash (19,000 L); 3 spirit (12,000 L)
- Capacity: 6,500,000 L
- Mothballed: 1930–1937, 1942–1945

Caol Ila
- Age(s): 12-year-old cask strength 18-year-old 25-year-old
- Cask type(s): American oak
- ABV: 43%

Caol Ila distillery (/kʊˈliːlə/; Scottish Gaelic: Taigh-staile Chaol Ìle [t̪ʰəˈs̪t̪alə xɯːlˈiːlə], "Sound of Islay Distillery") is a Scotch whisky distillery near Port Askaig on the isle of Islay, Scotland, owned by Diageo.

== History ==
Caol Ila is derived from Gaelic Caol Ìle for "Sound of Islay" (lit. "Islay Strait") in reference to the distillery's location overlooking the strait between Islay and Jura. It was founded in 1846 by Hector Henderson. The distillery did not fare well, and changed hands in 1854 when Norman Buchanan, owner of the Isle of Jura Distillery, took over. In 1863 the business was acquired by Bulloch Lade & Co, of Glasgow, traders in whisky stocks. According to the 1871 census, Duncan Johnston was the Distillery Manager at the time. Duncan was the nephew of John Johnston of Lagavulin and cousin to the Laphroaig Johnstons and so the family were involved with yet another distillery on the island. By the 1880s over 147,000 imperial gallons (670,000 L) of whisky were produced there each year.

In 1920 Bulloch Lade went into voluntary liquidation, and a consortium of businessmen formed the Caol Ila Distillery Company Ltd. In 1927 the Distillers Company acquired a controlling interest in Caol Ila, and in 1930 Scottish Malt Distillers Ltd obtained ownership of all the shares. The distillery closed during World War II, from 1942 to 1945, because of wartime restrictions on the supply of barley to distillers. From then, production continued until 1972, when the entire structure of the distillery was demolished. A larger distillery was then built, designed by George Leslie Darge in the same architectural style as many of his others with his trademark glazed curtain walls to the still houses, and production resumed in 1974. The company eventually became part of Diageo.

== The whisky ==
Caol Ila is one of the lighter Islay whiskies, pale in colour, with peaty, floral and peppery notes. In addition to being sold as a single malt, it is used heavily (around 95% of their production) in blends such as Johnnie Walker's Black Label. Since 1999, the distillery has also produced a non-peated "highland spirit".

== Awards ==
Different expressions of Caol Ila have generally rated highly at spirit ratings competitions. The 12-year, for example, received two double gold, three gold, and one silver medal from the San Francisco World Spirits Competition between 2005 and 2010. It also received an above-average score of 90-95 from Wine Enthusiast in 2005. The 18- and 25-year expressions, though not as frequently rated by outside agencies, have also tended to score well.

== See also ==
- Islay whisky
- Scotch whisky
- Whisky
- List of whisky brands
- List of distilleries in Scotland
