= Bunnahabhain =

Village on Islay in Scotland

Coordinates: 55°53′2″N 6°7′46″W

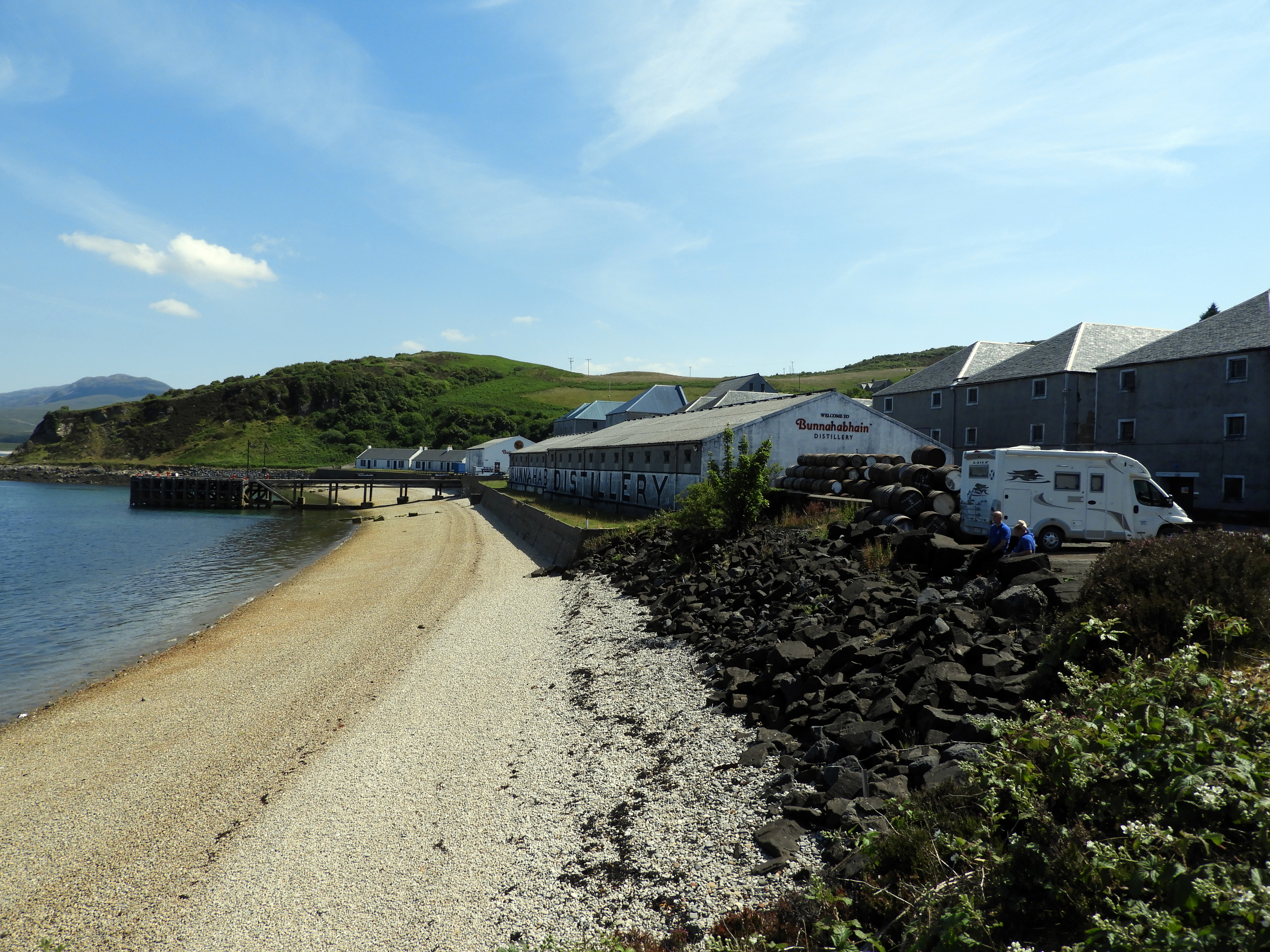
Bunnahabhain

Bunnahabhain (/ˌbuːnəˈhævɪn/ BOO-nə-HAV-in; from Scottish Gaelic Bun na h-Abhainne ([punəˈhavɪɲə], English: /ˌbuːnəˈhɑːvɪn/), meaning 'foot of the river') is a village on the northeast coast of the isle of Islay, which is in the Argyll and Bute area of Scotland, in the Inner Hebrides group of islands. It is also the name of a malt whisky distillery located there.

== History ==
The village was established in 1881 to house the distillery's workers, and the distillery still employs the majority of the village's workers.

The surrounding area is also steeped in local history. The ruined village of Margadale, nestled between Margadale Hill and Scarbh Bhreac, was once the busiest marketplace on Islay, with people coming from all over the island for cattle sales.

== Wildlife ==
The area is rich in wildlife, boasting large numbers of red deer, roe deer, wild goats, otters, common and grey seals, seabirds such as cormorants and oystercatchers and also Lepidoptera, with peacock and speckled wood butterflies being a common sight.

== Shipwrecks ==
Perched on the rocks to the south of the village is the wreck of the 338-ton trawler “Wyre Majestic” which ran aground after hitting the rocks at Rubha a’Mhail on 18 October 1974. Despite efforts from the crew of its sister ship, “Wyre Defence”, the ship was deemed unsalvageable and has sat on the rocks ever since, as do approximately 50 other ships wrecked in the perilous Sound of Islay.
