= Loch Indaal =

Loch Indaal Lighthouse Rubh'an Duin
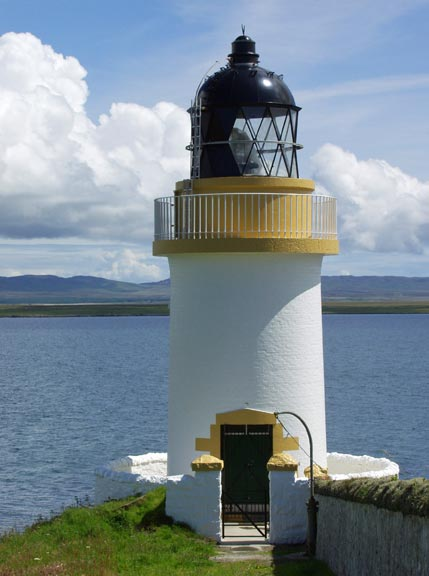
- The lighthouse just outside Port Charlotte on Islay.
- Location: Port Charlotte; Islay; Argyll and Bute; Scotland; United Kingdom
- Coordinates: 55.744760°N 6.372223°W

Tower
- Constructed: 1869
- Construction: brick tower
- Height: 13 metres (43 ft)
- Shape: ctlindrical tower with balcony and lantern
- Markings: white tower, black lantern, ochre trim
- Power source: mains electricity
- Operator: Northern Lighthouse Board

Light
- Focal height: 15 metres (49 ft)
- Range: 11 nmi (20 km; 13 mi) (white), 8 nmi (15 km; 9.2 mi) (red)
- Characteristic: Fl(2) WR 7s.

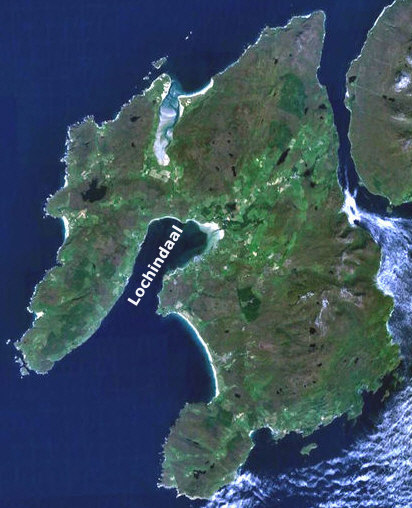

Loch Indaal (or Lochindaal) is a sea loch on Islay, the southernmost island of the Hebrides, off the west coast of Scotland. Together with Loch Gruinart to the north, it was formed by the Loch Gruinart Fault, which branches off the Great Glen Fault.

Along the northwestern coast are the villages of Bruichladdich and Port Charlotte. Along its northeastern shore is the tiny village of Bridgend and on its southeastern shore is the island capital of Bowmore.

At night the lights of the villages along the three sides of the loch inspired the well-known folk song "The Lights of Lochindaal" by Iain Simpson.

South of Bowmore the entire coastline is a six-mile-long (ten-kilometre) sandy beach stretching to Kintra. This beach, known as the Big Strand, is very popular with holidaymakers and locals alike in the summer.

== Waters ==
Loch Indaal slopes gently from its northeast corner down to its opening into the Atlantic. At the mouth of the loch, which lies between Portnahaven to the north and the American Monument on The Oa to the south, the depth is around 40 metres, rising steadily upwards towards the northeast and reaching a depth of barely 10 metres between Laggan Point and Port Charlotte.

The waters of the loch are calm and safe but the approaches are hazardous especially for small vessels. There are tidal streams, eddies, races and heavy overfalls both in the east and west flowing streams of the tide.

== The Big Strand and Laggan Bay ==
The eastern shore of the loch is taken up by the six-mile (ten-kilometre) length of the Big Strand, the area as a whole being known as Laggan Bay. The Big Strand itself is sandy along its whole length being broken by a rocky outcrop roughly half way along its length at Glenegedale Airport.

In the north the Big Strand is accessible by car along a stretch of unmade road leading from Island farm, on a road signed off the A846 south of Bowmore. The river Laggan empties into the ocean near the northern point of the beach. In the south the Big Strand is accessible from Kintra Farm on the Oa.

Glenegedale Airport has two runways, although one is not in use. The approach from to the northwest runway takes aircraft over Lochindaal at very low altitude giving excellent views of Laggan Bay.

== See also ==
- List of lighthouses in Scotland
- List of Northern Lighthouse Board lighthouses
- MV Loch Indaal

== Gallery ==
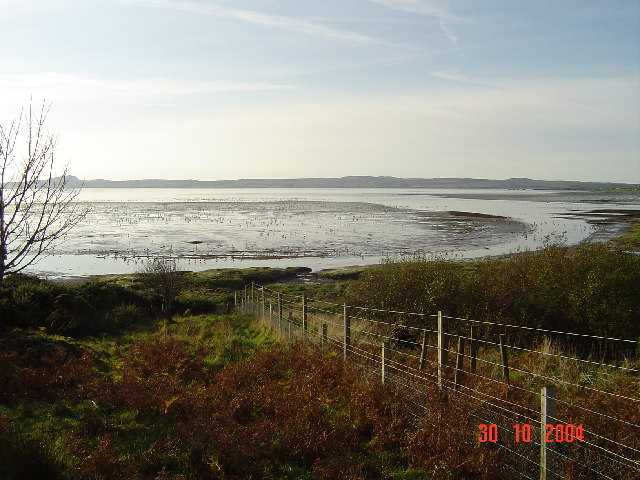
Looking west across the loch to the Rinns at low tide

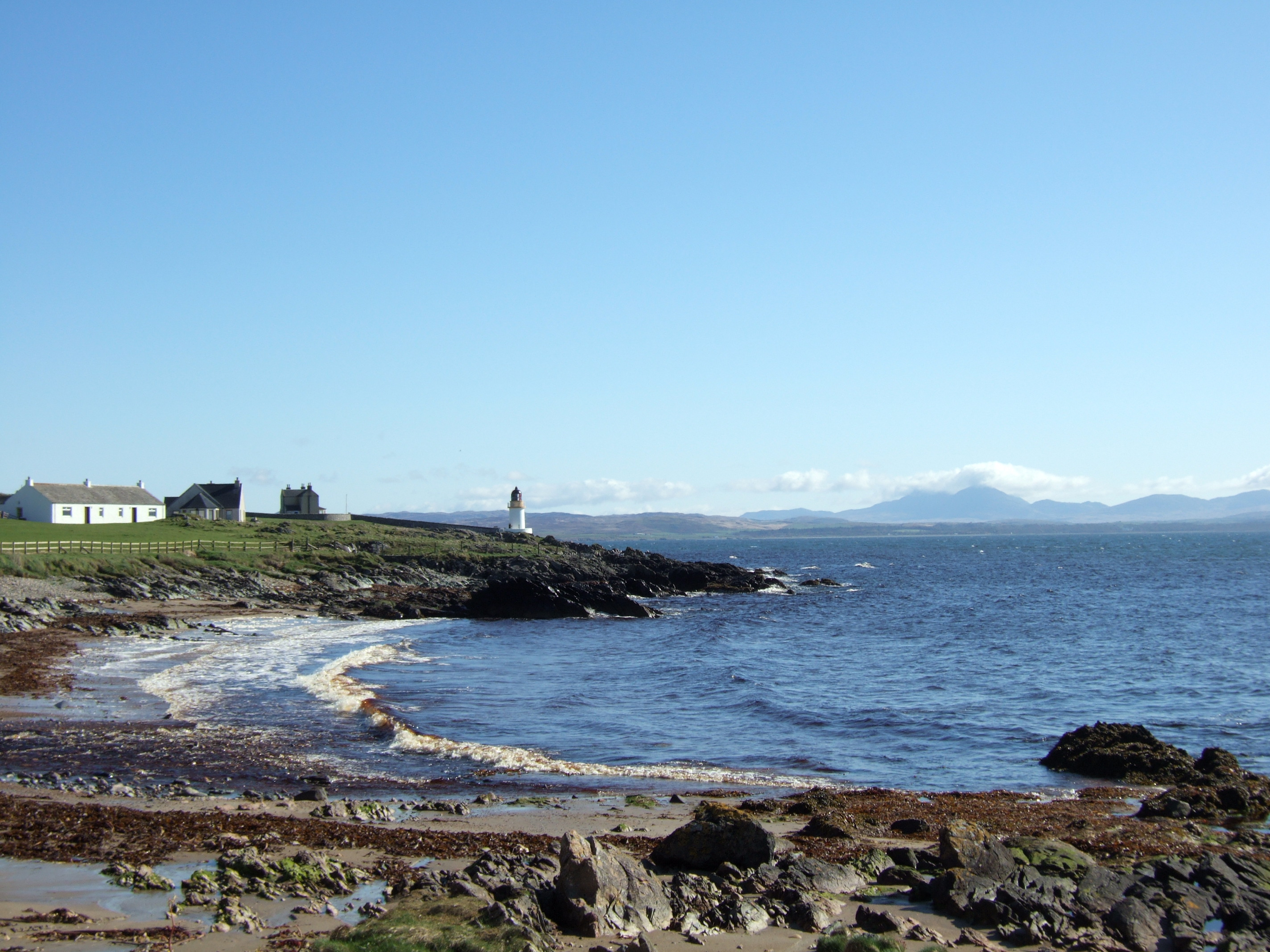
Looking north from Port Charlotte across the loch to Jura

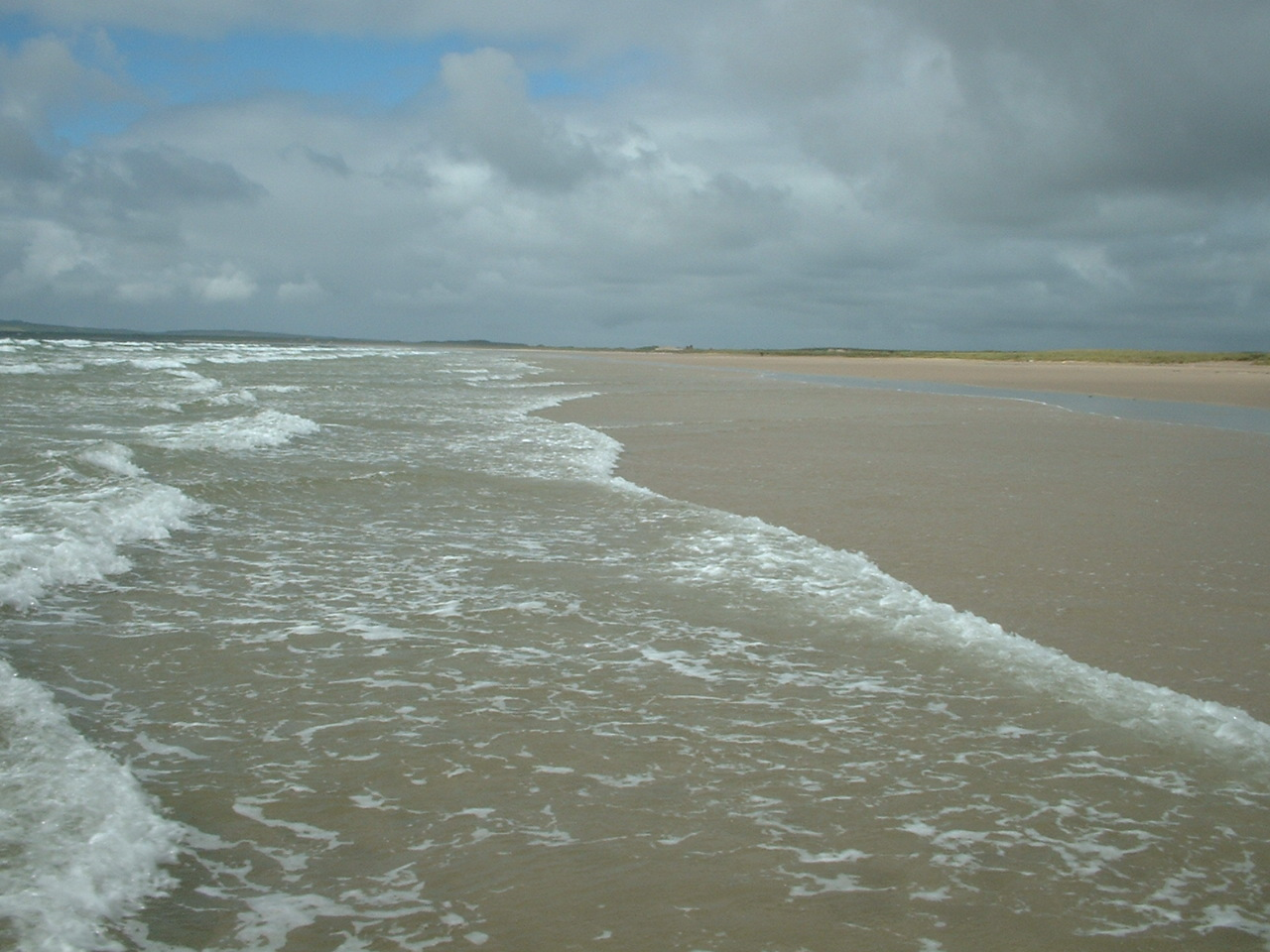
The Big Strand

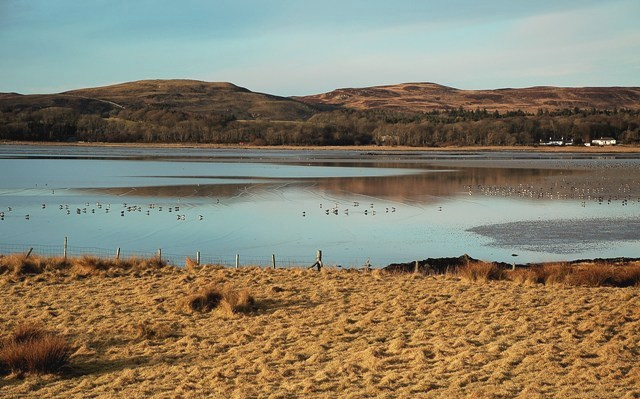
Towards Traigh Cill an Rubha Looking across the head of Loch Indaal in late afternoon

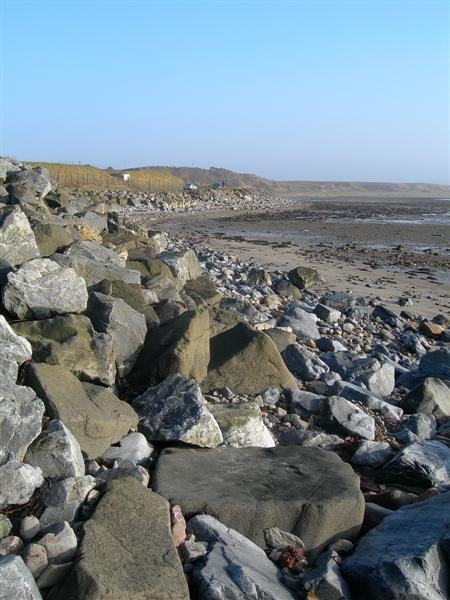
The shore at Gortan, Loch Indaal looking along the edge of the shore at low tide
