= Port Charlotte, Islay =

Coordinates: 55.739°N 6.378°W

Port Charlotte: Scottish Gaelic: Port Sgioba
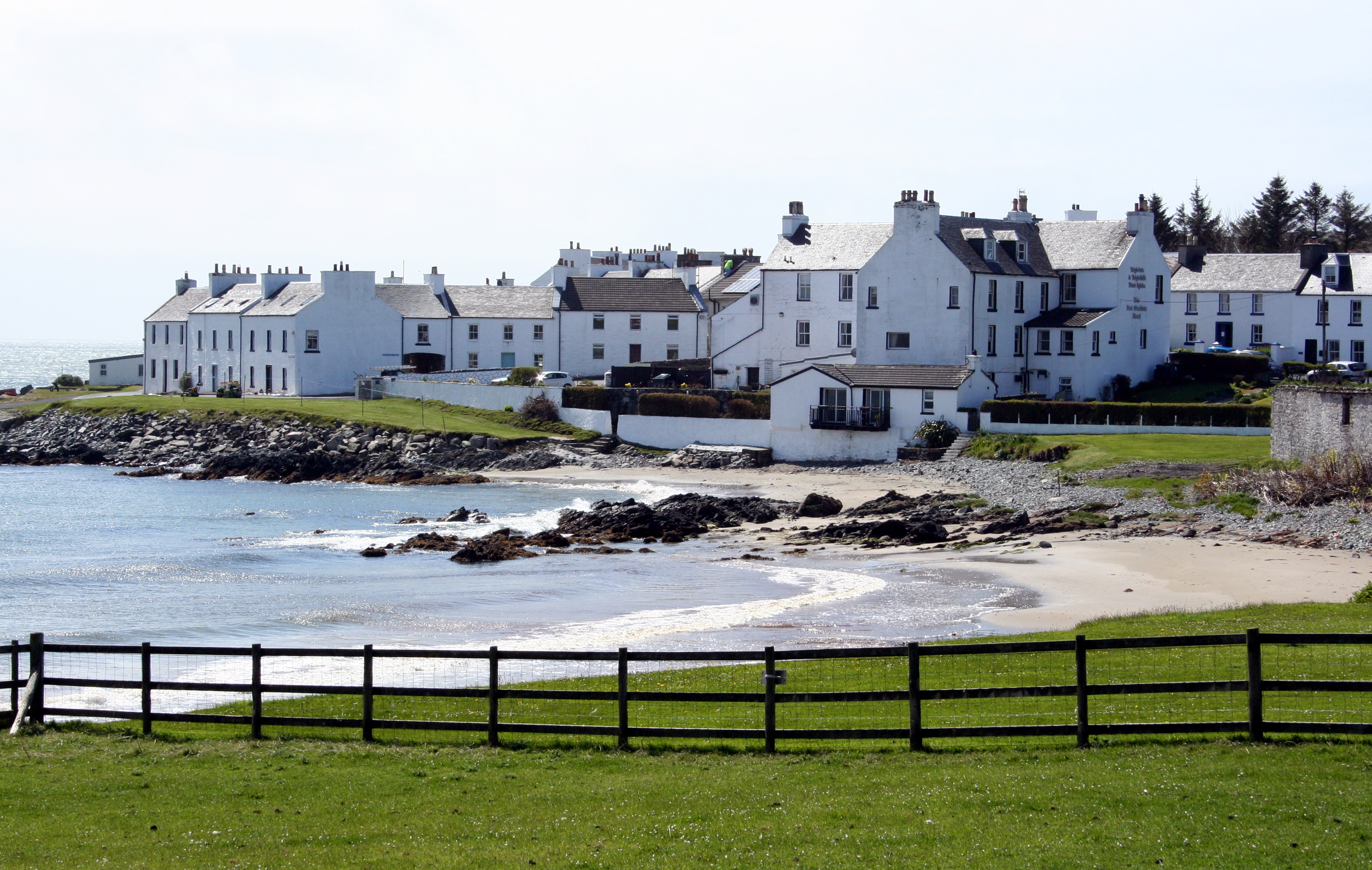
- Looking south towards Port Charlotte

- Location within Argyll and Bute
- Population: 350 (1991)
- OS grid reference: NR252581
- Civil parish: Kilchoman
- Council area: Argyll and Bute
- Lieutenancy area: Argyll and Bute
- Country: Scotland
- Sovereign state: United Kingdom
- Post town: ISLE OF ISLAY
- Postcode district: PA48
- Dialling code: 01496
- Police: Scotland
- Fire: Scottish
- Ambulance: Scottish
- UK Parliament: Argyll, Bute and South Lochaber
- Scottish Parliament: Argyll and Bute

Port Charlotte (Scottish Gaelic: Port Sgioba) is a village on the island of Islay in the Inner Hebrides, Scotland. It was founded in 1828. In 1991 it had a population of 350.

On 24 September 1828 the foundation stone of the pier was laid at a fete attended by 4,000 of Walter Frederick Campbell's tenants. Port Charlotte was named after Lady Charlotte Campbell Bury, the mother of its founder Walter Frederick Campbell; and it was set up mainly to provide housing facilities for the Lochindaal Distillery work force.

By 1833 a chapel had been built in the village which was in use but far from complete.

In 1846 contractors were invited to construct a quay at Port Charlotte, which was funded by Thomas Pattison, Distiller of Octomore and designed by Mr. Pitbladdo of Bridgend and this was completed by 1848.

Parts of the former distillery buildings are now in use as Youth Hostel and Wildlife Centre. Others are currently used by a garage nearby. The remaining warehouses are currently owned and used by Bruichladdich distillery to mature their Port Charlotte heavily peated spirit, named in tribute to the village and original distillery.

The village is located on the shores of Loch Indaal and is very picturesque with its white-painted houses. It is home to the Museum of Islay Life which is located in a former Church building.

In October 1813, the American privateer The True Blooded Yankee captured six merchant ships lying at Port Charlotte, casting them adrift and setting fire to three.

== See also ==
- Port Charlotte distillery
