= Port Askaig =

Coordinates: 55.848°N 6.106°W

Port Askaig: Scottish Gaelic: Port Asgaig
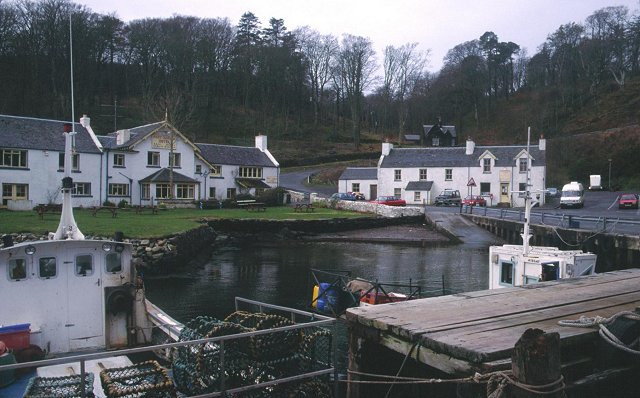
- Port Askaig

- Location within Argyll and Bute
- OS grid reference: NR430692
- Council area: Argyll and Bute
- Lieutenancy area: Argyll and Bute
- Country: Scotland
- Sovereign state: United Kingdom
- Post town: ISLE OF ISLAY
- Postcode district: PA46
- Dialling code: 01496
- UK Parliament: Argyll, Bute and South Lochaber
- Scottish Parliament: Argyll and Bute

Port Askaig (Scottish Gaelic: Port Asgaig) is a port village on the east coast of the island of Islay, in Argyll and Bute, Scotland. The village lies on the Sound of Islay (Caol Ìle) across from Jura.

== Economy ==
Port Askaig has a hotel, a petrol station and shop next to the port but has very few households. In 2014, it was rated one of the most attractive postcode areas to live in Scotland.

=== Whisky ===
Port Askaig is also the name of a Scotch whisky range, bottled by Elixir Distillers. The producing distillery is not officially identified but the whiskies are marketed as Islay single malts.

The distilleries Caol Ila, Ardnahoe and Bunnahabhain are all located to the north of the port.

== Transport ==
=== Water ===
Port Askaig serves as the main port of Islay, sharing passenger services to the Scottish mainland with Port Ellen. It also has a regular service to Feolin, Jura across the Sound of Islay, and in the summer there is also a weekly service via Colonsay to Oban. Port Askaig has been a port for landing passengers and goods to Islay for centuries. Ships which sailed out from West Loch Tarbert on the Kintyre Peninsula have called in at Port Askaig since the 18th century and a steamer service from Glasgow was the running as early as 1825.

Port Askaig is the base of the Islay RNLI lifeboat which is called out ten to twelve times a year.

Preceding station	Ferry	Following station
Colonsay (limited service)	Caledonian MacBrayne; Ferry	Kennacraig
Terminus	Jura Ferry; Car ferry	Jura

==== Port development ====
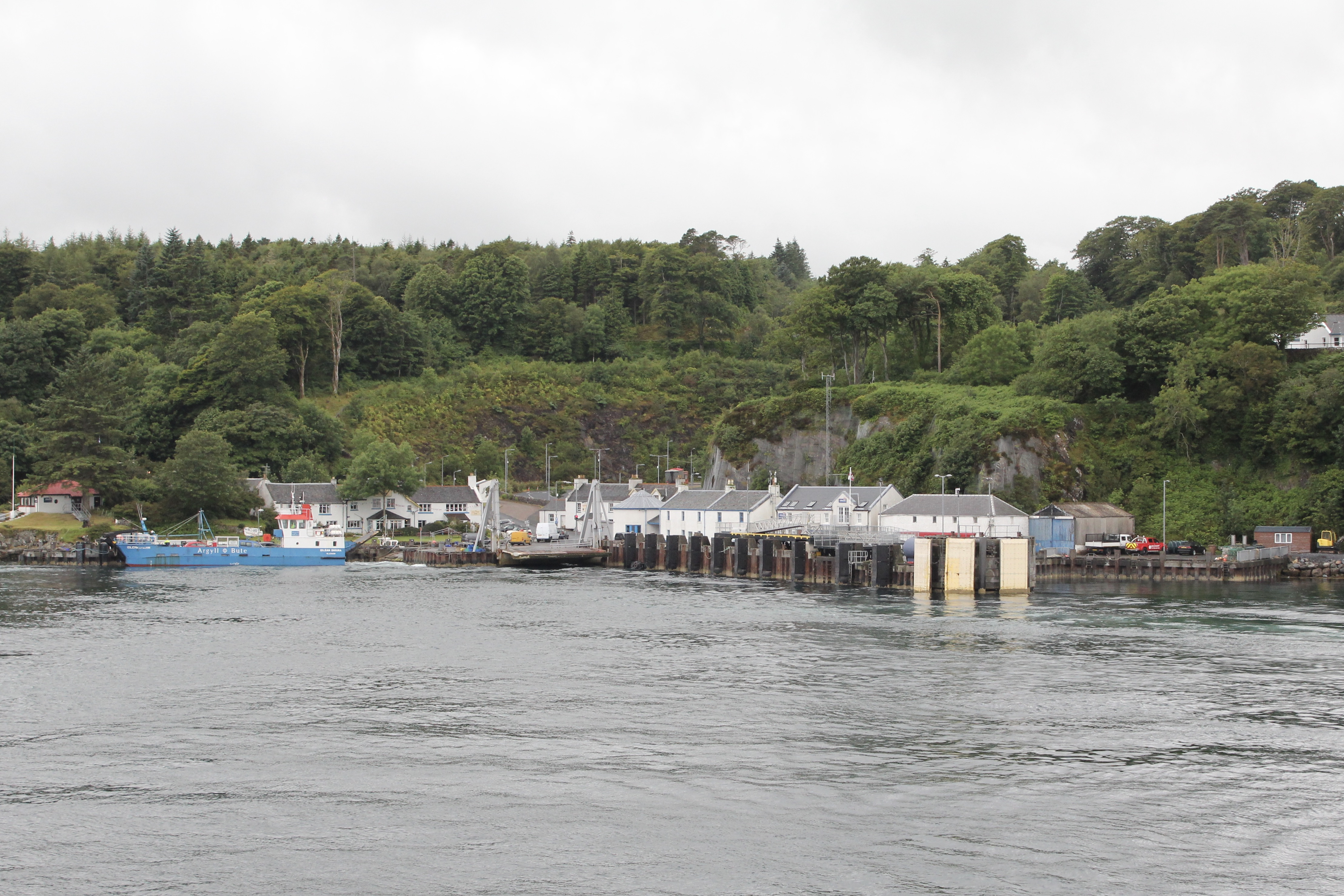
The port of Askaig

Between 2003 and 2009 Port Askaig was the site of a £13.7 million civil engineering project. The work included a new linkspan and other berthing facilities for mainland ferries, new facilities for the Jura ferry, and new car parks and waiting rooms. The redeveloped port was officially re-opened on 10 September 2009 by the Princess Royal.

=== Road ===
Port Askaig is situated at the northern end of the Islay section of the A846, which continues south-west to Bowmore, south-east to Port Ellen and finally east to Ardbeg.

== Music ==
Port Askaig is memorialised in the classic 6/8 bagpipe pipe march Leaving Port Askaig.

== See also ==
- Port Askaig Tillite Formation – Geological formation in Scotland and Ireland
