= Duncan Taylor (company) =

Scottish alcoholic beverage company

Duncan Taylor Ltd
- Company type: Limited company
- Industry: Beverages
- Founded: 1938 (Glasgow)
- Headquarters: Huntly, Scotland
- Key people: Shawn Smith (Owner and Director)
- Products: Alcoholic beverages: spirits
- Number of employees: 28 (2015)
- Website: www.duncantaylor.com

Duncan Taylor Scotch Whisky Limited is an independent alcoholic beverages company based in Huntly, Scotland. The company is a whisky merchant with a collection of aged single malt and single grain Scotch whisky casks. It releases spirits under various product brands, which are bottled at its headquarters in Huntly.

The brands include The Rarest, Duncan Taylor Single Cask, The Octave, Black Bull, Indian Summer, Smokin' and Tantalus.

== History ==
Duncan Taylor was founded in Glasgow in 1938 as a cask broker and trading company. Over the decades, the company built strong ties with distillers and distilleries over Scotland, with the company bringing their own casks to the distilleries to be filled with new make spirit. This resulted in a collection of cask whiskies distilleries – many of which are now closed – which are still maturing in the Duncan Taylor warehouses today.

The company was acquired by Euan Shand in 2001, whose experience in the industry has included stints at the Glendronach distillery, William Teacher's & Sons, and founding and running The Bennachie Whisky Company. Euan subsequently moved Duncan Taylor to his home town of Huntly, acquired a facility in the town which he converted to a bottling plant, and established Duncan Taylor as an independent bottling company.

In April 2024 a new chapter began for Duncan Taylor Scotch Whisky Ltd. Shawn Smith was announced as the new Director and owner following the retirement of Chairman Euan Shand. Shawn brings a wealth of experience in technology finance and whisky and will continue the mantel as a family-owned business where Duncan Taylor Scotch Whisky has amassed an impressive portfolio of vintage and rare scotch whisky casks.

== Brands ==
Duncan Taylor has a portfolio of brands. Including:

Gin

- Indian Summer

Rum

- The Duncan Taylor Caribbean Rum
- The Duncan Taylor Single Cask Rum

Blended Scotch Whisky

- Black Bull
- Scottish Glory
- Smokin'

Blended Malt Scotch Whisky

- Auld Reekie
- The Big Smoke

Single Malt Scotch Whisky

- Battlehill
- Dimensions
- The Duncan Taylor Single
- The Duncan Taylor Tantalus
- The Octave
- The Rarest

== Awards ==
Some Duncan Taylor & Co brands have received awards in various editions of Jim Murray's Whisky Bible.

A North British 1978, cask Q247, 54.7% abv from the Rare Auld range received a "Liquid Gold Award" in the 2010 Whisky Bible (awards are granted to any whiskies which score 94 or above out of a maximum 100 points). The single cask grain whisky was also rated "Scotch Grain of the Year".

Based on ratings by blind tasting panels, Duncan Taylor & Co was awarded the "Independent Bottlers of Year" award from Whisky Magazine in 2006 (Highlands, Lowlands & Blended categories), 2007 (Lowlands), 2008 (Lowlands), and 2011 (Islay).
