= Jim Murray (whisky writer) =

British Journalist, Expert and Critic for Whiskey and Author

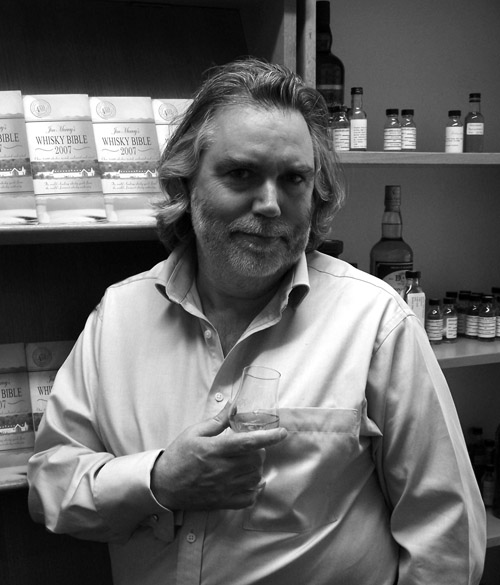
- Jim Murray at his tasting lab
- Born: 13 November 1957 (age 68); Merstham, Surrey
- Occupation: Whisky writer
- Website: Dram Good Books

Jim Murray (born 13 November 1957) is an English writer, journalist and whisky critic. He gives observations on whisky and his annually updated book on the subject, Jim Murray's Whisky Bible.

== Life ==
Murray was born in Merstham, Surrey, UK. A keen journalist from a young age, he wrote for his local papers while still at school and presented his own television show in Northamptonshire, Murray on Monday, at the age of sixteen. Murray would report and comment on local sporting events. His passion for writing and sport, specifically football, culminated in his first book Millwall: Lions of the South (1988), a history of Murray's beloved and unfashionable Millwall F.C.

As a national newspaper journalist with the Sunday People and Daily Star in 1992, Murray left Fleet Street after 13 years to become a whisky writer. Having visited his first distillery, Talisker in 1975, he believes that he has since visited more distilleries globally than any person. He had used his secondments to Scotland in the early and mid-1980s to visit as many distilleries as possible and even work in them during his free time.

1994 saw the release of Jim Murray's Irish Whiskey Almanac, the first of many whisky books that he would go on to write. This book was revised and extended for a re-release three years later as Classic Irish Whiskey (1997). Other publications include Jim Murray's Complete Book of Whisky (1997), Classic Bourbon, Tennessee & Rye (1998), Classic Blended Scotch (1999) and The Art of Whisky (1998).

Murray won the Glenfiddich Whisky Writer of the Year award three times. He has said that he fiercely guards his independence and honesty, which he believes can be compromised by writing for advertising-dependent media. His recent magazine writings have been selective and only on the understanding that he retains full copyright. To further protect his writing, Murray has trademarked his name.

Jim Murray's Whisky Bible is an ongoing project, with the first of the series having been published in 2003. It is a compact guide containing every whisky that Murray and a team of researchers are able to source from the worldwide market. Each whisky is tasted by Murray alone and graded out of an overall score of 100. This total is reflective of the four key criteria: nose, taste, finish and balance, each awarded marks out of 25. With every new edition of The Whisky Bible, Murray provides tasting notes and ratings for around 1,000 newly released or previously obscure whiskies, with nearly 4,000 brands being reviewed overall.

As well as writing and broadcasting on whisky, and being a chair judge at the International Wine and Spirit Competition, Murray has also worked as a consultant blender with both whisky and rum. He claims one of his achievements includes playing a major role in resurrecting Ardbeg distillery in Islay after it closed in 1996. Murray has also championed the cause of American whiskey and Canadian rye whisky, Japanese whisky, and Irish single pot still whiskey, all of which had fallen out fashion when he first began writing about them. He travels often both for his advisory role and to visit various distilleries.

In late 2020, after claims were made that Murray's whisky reviews include sexist language, a distiller and a retailer sought to distance themselves from him. The Scotch Whisky Association characterized Mr. Murray's language as "offensive". Murray denied that his reviews were sexist, stating "It is to do with sensuality. All foods and drinks are sensual."

Murray lives in Northamptonshire, England, and also has a home near Frankfort, Kentucky, United States, in the heart of the bourbon-making region.

== Selected bibliography ==
- Murray, James (1988). Millwall: Lions of the South
- Murray, Jim (1994). Jim Murray's Irish Whiskey Almanac
- Murray, Jim (1997). The Complete Guide to Whisky
- Murray, Jim (1997). Classic Irish Whiskey
- Murray, Jim (1998). Classic Bourbon, Tennessee & Rye Whiskey
- Murray, Jim (1998). The Art of Whisky ISBN 1-873162-67-7
- Murray, Jim (1999). Classic Blended Scotch
- Murray, Jim (2003). Jim Murray's Whisky Bible 2004 ISBN 1-84442-991-1
- Murray, Jim (2004). Jim Murray's Whisky Bible 2005 ISBN 1-84442-670-X
- Murray, Jim (2005). Jim Murray's Whisky Bible 2006 ISBN 1-84442-550-9
- Murray, Jim (2006). Jim Murray's Whisky Bible 2007 ISBN 978-0-9554729-0-9
- Murray, Jim (2007). Jim Murray's Whisky Bible 2008 ISBN 978-0-9554729-2-3
- Murray, Jim (2008). Jim Murray's Whisky Bible 2009 ISBN 978-0-9554729-3-0
- Murray, Jim (2009). Jim Murray's Whisky Bible 2010 ISBN 978-0-9554729-4-7
- Murray, Jim (2010). Jim Murray's Whisky Bible 2011 ISBN 978-0-9554729-5-4
- Murray, Jim (2011). Jim Murray's Whisky Bible 2012 ISBN 978-0-9554729-6-1
- Murray, Jim (2012). Jim Murray's Whisky Bible 2013 ISBN 978-0-9554729-7-8
- Murray, Jim (2013). Jim Murray's Whisky Bible 2014 ISBN 978-0-9554729-8-5
- Murray, Jim (2014). Jim Murray's Whisky Bible 2015 ISBN 978-0-9554729-9-2
- Murray, Jim (2015). Jim Murray's Whisky Bible 2016 ISBN 978-0-9932986-0-8
- Murray, Jim (2016). Jim Murray's Whisky Bible 2017 ISBN 978-0-9932986-1-5
- Murray, Jim (2017). Jim Murray's Whisky Bible 2018 ISBN 978-0-9932986-2-2
- Murray, Jim (2018). Jim Murray's Whisky Bible 2019 ISBN 9780993298639

== See also ==
- Michael Jackson (writer)
