= Ardbeg distillery =

Scotch whisky distillery on Islay, Scotland

Coordinates: 55°38′26″N 06°06′31″W

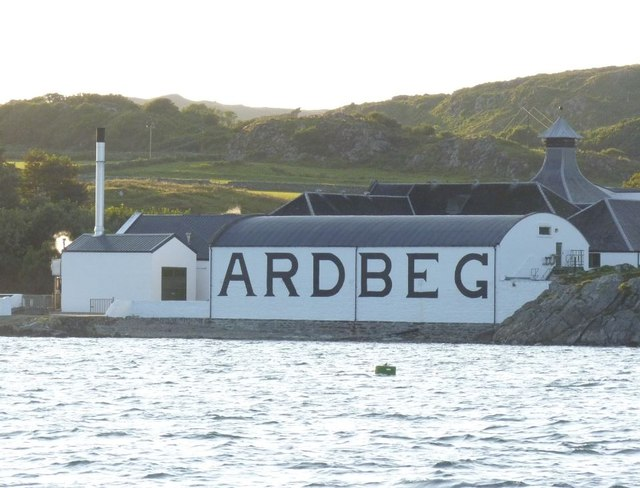

Region: Islay
- Owner: LVMH
- Founded: 1815
- Status: Operational
- Water source: Loch Uigeadail
- No. of stills: 2 wash (18,000 L); 2 spirit (17,000 L)
- Capacity: 1,250,000 litres
- Website: www.ardbeg.com

Ardbeg
- Type: Single Malt Scotch Whisky
- Age(s): 10 Years
- Cask type(s): Bourbon, Sherry

Ardbeg distillery (/ˈɑːrdbɛɡ/; Scottish Gaelic: Taigh-staile na h-Àirde Bige) is an Islay single malt Scotch whisky distillery in Ardbeg on the south coast of the isle of Islay, Argyll and Bute, Scotland, in the Inner Hebrides group of islands.

The distillery is owned by Louis Vuitton Moët Hennessy, and produces a heavily peated Islay whisky. The distillery uses malted barley sourced from the maltings in Port Ellen.

The name Ardbeg is an anglicisation of the Scottish Gaelic An Àird Bheag, meaning The Small Promontory.

== History ==
The Ardbeg distillery has been producing whisky since 1798, and began commercial production in 1815. Like most Scottish distilleries, for most of its history its whisky was produced for use in blended whisky, rather than as a single malt. By 1886 the distillery was producing 300,000 gallons of whisky per year, and employed 60 workers.

Hiram Walker took full control of Ardbeg distillery in 1979. Production was halted in 1981, and resumed on a limited basis in 1989 and continued at a low level until late 1996.

In 1997, the distillery was bought and reopened by Glenmorangie plc (which was subsequently acquired by the French company LVMH on 28 December 2004). Limited production resumed 25 June 1997, and full production in 1998. The distillery was reopened by Ed Dodson in 1997 and handed over to Stuart Thomson, who managed it from 1997 to 2006. Michael "Mickey" Heads, an Islay native and former manager at Jura who had worked at Ardbeg years earlier, took over on 12 March 2007. Colin Gordon has followed in his footsteps since August 2020.

In July 2022, the distillery sold a 1975 cask to a private collector for £16 million, beating Macallan's £1 million record for the highest cask selling price.

== Production ==
The distillery output is quite large for a distillery with only two pot stills. The wash still has a capacity of about 18,000 litres, and the spirit still a capacity of about 17,000 litres. This produces approximately 10,000 barrels (1.4 million liters) of spirit per year. The distillery employs about sixty people and also provides them with accommodation on site. Since 2018, a new still house is under construction, which will double Ardbeg's distilling capacity.

In 2011, 20 vials of Ardbeg spirit and wood particles were sent to the International Space Station to investigate their interaction. They returned on 12 September 2014.

== Products ==
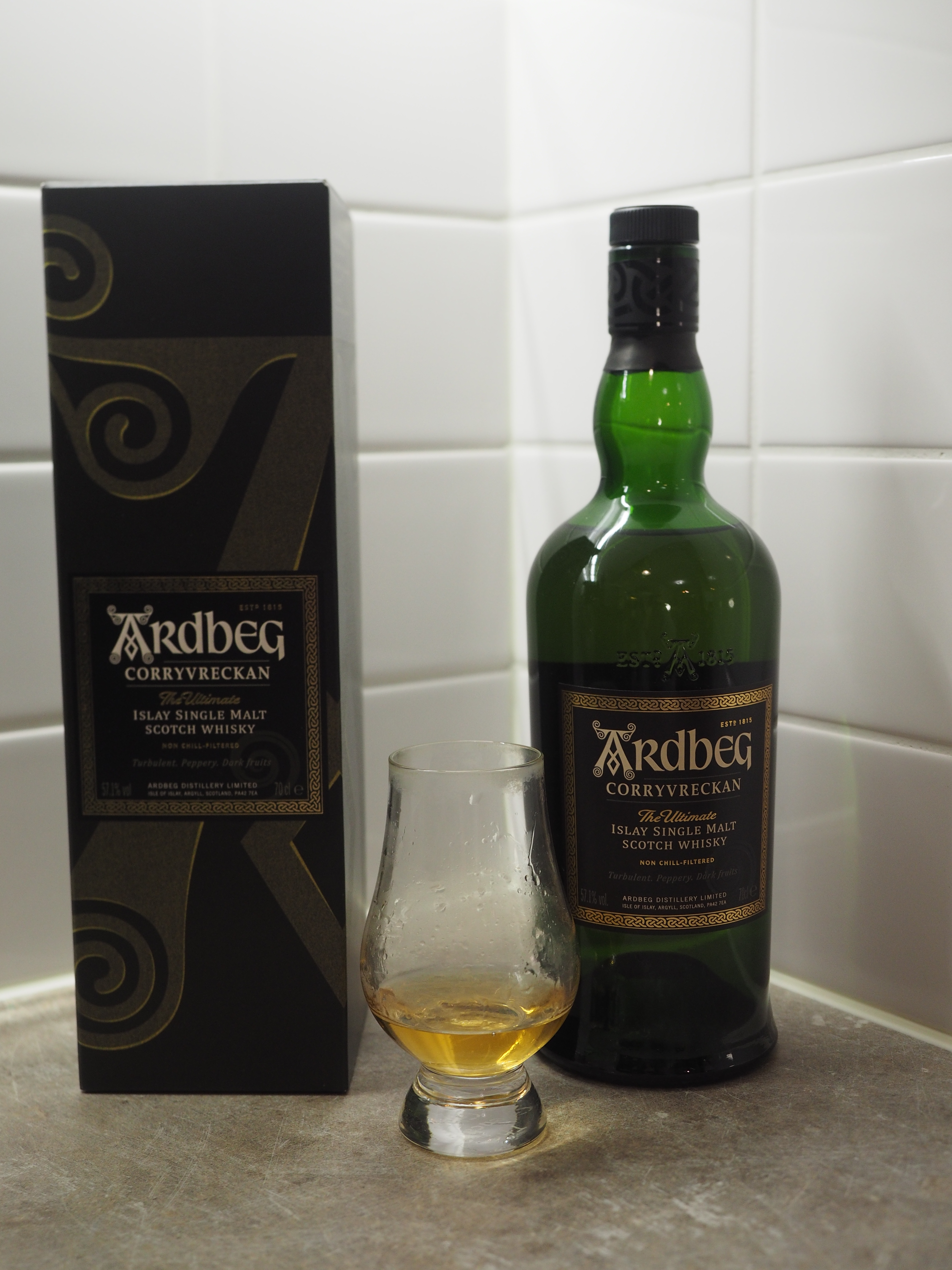
Ardbeg Corryvreckan, named after a whirlpool situated to the north of Islay, has a particularly peated flavour.

The whiskies of Ardbeg are mostly heavily peated malts. Compared to other Islay malts, Ardbeg does not focus on the sea and salt tastes, but rather on aromas of spices, malt or sweet tones like vanilla and chocolate. The core range of Ardbeg consists of the Ardbeg TEN, Wee Beastie, An Oa, Uigeadail and Corryvreckan. The TEN is named after its age. Uigeadail was named after Loch Uigeadail (/ˈuːɡədæl/), a loch in the hills about 4 km north of Ardbeg which is a source of water for the distillery. The Corryvreckan bottle takes its name from a famous sea vortex between the Isle of Jura and the Isle of Scarba. In June 2024, the distillery released a new edition of the Corryvreckan from 2008. The special bottling was created in collaboration with the comic artist Tradd Moore and is limited to 250 bottles.

== Awards ==
Ardbeg has won various awards at international spirit ratings competitions. For example:

- Jim Murray's Whisky Bible 2008 awarded the Ten Years Old expression the title of 2008 World Whisky of the Year and Scotch Single Malt of the Year. The Ten Years Old also won a series of medals at the 2006-2012 San Francisco World Spirits Competition, winning two gold and six silver medals over that stretch.
- Jim Murray's Whisky Bible 2009 and Whisky Bible 2010 awarded the Uigeadail expression the title of 2009 and 2010 World Whisky of the Year and Scotch Single Malt of the Year. The San Francisco World Spirits Competition awarded the Uigeadail two double gold, three gold, and two silver medals between 2006 and 2012.
- Ardbeg Galileo won the World's Best Single Malt Whisky in the 2013 World Whiskies Awards.

== Managers ==
- Hamish Scott (1964–7
- Don Raitt
- Iain Henderson
- Ed Dodson (1997)
- Stuart Thomson (1997–2006)
- Mickey Heads (2007–2020)
- Colin Gordon (2020–2025)

== Cultural references ==
Ardbeg inspired the Finnish composer of contemporary music, Osmo Tapio Räihälä, to write the symphonic poem Ardbeg—The Ultimate Piece For Orchestra (2003); it was recorded by the Finnish Radio Symphony Orchestra on 28 April 2011.

== See also ==
- List of whisky distilleries in Scotland
- List of historic whisky distilleries
