= Cenél nÓengusa =

Islay (in green) and the rest of Argyll. Colonsay is the small island north of Islay and Jura the large island to the north east.

The Cenél nÓengusa were a kin group who ruled the island of Islay, and perhaps nearby Colonsay and Jura, off the western coast of Scotland in what was then the kingdom of Dál Riata in the early Middle Ages.

The Senchus fer n-Alban, a census and genealogy of the kingdom of Dál Riata, lists the Cenél nÓengusa as one of the three kin groups making up the kingdom, which is located in modern Argyll. The others were the Cenél nGabráin of Kintyre and Knapdale and the Cenél Loairn of Lorne. A fourth group, the Cenél Comgaill, of Cowal and the Isle of Bute, later split from the Cenél nGabráin. The Senchus traces the descent of the Cenél nÓengusa from Óengus Mór, son of Erc of Dalriada, who lived in the mid-5th century but unlike the other main kindreds the lineage does not seem to have produced one of the high kings of Dál Riata and they may have been absorbed into one of the other kindreds c. 627.

The Celtic monastic system of the time made use of isolated retreat centres and one of them may have been on Nave Island off Islay's northwest coast. Mainland Dál Riata had an extensive trade network as early as the late sixth and seventh centuries in which it is likely that the Christian church had a crucial role but the there is limited evidence of Cenél nÓengusa's participation in this.

At some point in the 9th century, the beleaguered kingdom of Dál Riata lost the Hebrides to the Vikings, which is the latest end date for Cenél nÓengusa rule there. However, it is possible that this kindred re-settled in eastern Scotland. The medieval Lords of the Isles had their seat at Finlaggan on Islay and claimed descent from Erc but historians consider these claims to be dubious at best.

== Geography and settlement ==
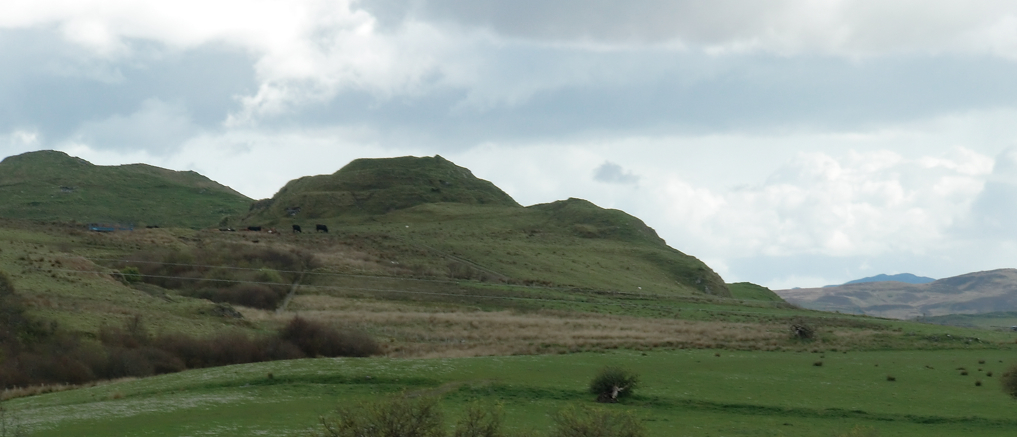
The ruins of Dun Nosebridge fort from the south

The extent of Cenél nÓengusa control of territory beyond Islay, if any, is not clear. Nieke speculates that Colonsay pertained to Cenél Loairn and Jura to Cenél nGabráin while Youngson includes Jura in their lands. Chadwick equivocates about Jura and states that the "early ownership of Colonsay is unknown". The Alcocks state that Cenél nÓengusa "held Islay alone".

Mainland Argyll has three important Dál Riata sites: Dun Ollaigh, near Oban, Dunadd, near Crinan and Dunaverty at Southend, Kintyre. but no evidence of a similar royal centre exists on Islay. The most spectacular prehistoric structure on the island is Dun Nosebridge. This 375-square-metre (4,040 sq ft) Iron Age fort occupies a prominent crag and has commanding views of the surrounding landscape. The construction and almost rectangular plan of the fort, "draws it apart from most of the iron-age defences in the area" but no certain date for its occupation has been established.

The 7th century Senchus, which is the oldest known census in Britain, lists hundreds of "houses", which indicates that a substantial number of dwellings existed at the time. For every twenty "houses" the cenela were required to provide a crew for two seven-bench fighting ships and Cenèl nÓengusa had 430 such houses in 100 villages and a muster strength of 500. Dál Riata as a whole had a military force that was up to 2,000 strong. (Note: Nieke has a total military complement of 2,000 following Alcock. Youngson estimates 1,400 out of a total Dalriadan population of 7-8,000 "excluding the native Picts".)

The Senchus also lists the subdivisions of Islay, and the number of houses in each. In Odeich, twenty houses; in Freg, a hundred and twenty houses; in Clad-rois, sixty houses; in Rosdeorand, thirty houses; in Ardbes, thirty houses; in Loichrois, thirty houses; in Ath-caisil, thirty [in that land?]...thirty houses in Caillnae, but the holdings are small, namely thirty-one men. (Note: There have been various speculative attempts to identify these locations. However, the obliteration of pre-Norse names on Islay is almost total, and modern placenames on the island are a mixture of Norse and later Gaelic and English influences.)

The remains of numerous small duns have been found throughout Argyll and the former are particularly numerous on Islay where 49 have been recorded. Unfortunately, very few have been reliably dated. One that has is Dun Fhinn (Fingal's Castle) near Claggain Bay but the occupation periods appear to have been the first millennium BC and then a secondary one in the later medieval era. By contrast, in the 1980s 114 duns were recorded in assumed Cenél Loairn territory of which an estimated 105 were in use in the late first millennium. It has been speculated that many of these duns were constructed during a period of conflict associated with the formation of Dál Riata and could account for some of the "houses" recorded in the Senchus but on Islay at least there is no clear evidence for this.

There are also various crannogs on Islay, including sites in Loch Ardnave and at Loch Allallaidh in the south east where a stone causeway leading out towards two adjacent islands is visible beneath the surface of the water. They too are undated but a stone structure on one at Eilean na Comhairle, Finlaggan was identified as the remains of a 6th-century dun. (Note: This was found during work on the much later medieval structures there that are associated with the Lordship of the Isles.)

== Early history ==
The nature of the early settlement of the area by Gaelic-speaking peoples from Ireland is uncertain. Irish tradition tells of Cairbre Riata moving his people from Munster, first to Ulster and then to Kintyre and the Inner Hebrides c. 220 CE. It is not certain if the Dalriadic Scots relationship to the indigenous inhabitants of Argyll was one of conquest or if "they came in peace as Celts to a Celtic land", possibly to assist the Picts in their resistance to Rome. Archaeologists have been unable to find any evidence of large scale migration into Argyll in the early medieval period and some scholars claim that the Gaels in this part of Scotland were indigenous to the area. (Note: Nonetheless, Woolf concludes that "the Irish language was brought to Scotland by people migrating from Scotland to Ireland." The logic used is partly on the basis of Ptolemy ascribing the name Epidii to the tribe occupying Argyll and Ebudae Insulae to the Hebrides, which information may have come to him from voyages undertaken in the first century CE, indicating the earliest date at which this migration could have occurred. Watson took the view that Ptolemy's Epidion is specifically Islay.)

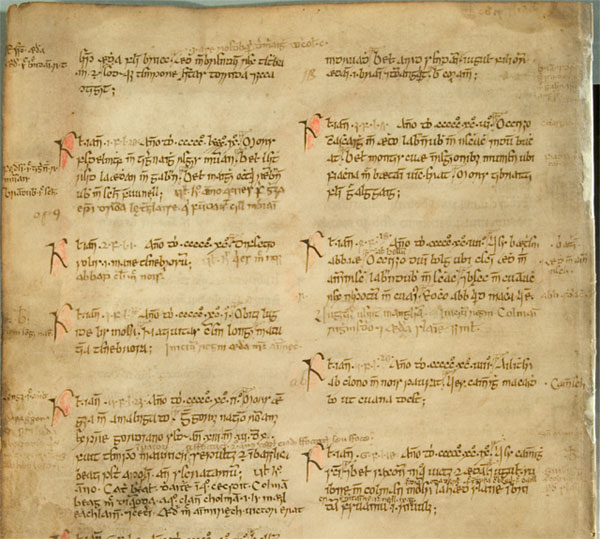
A page from the Annals of Ulster which records a battle on Islay in 627

The Senchus includes a "Chronicle of the Kings of Dalriata", which provides a foundation myth for the early rulers of the territory. Each of the three original kindreds traced their heritage back to one of the sons of Erc of Dalriada, who lived in the mid 5th century. This lists the descent of the Cenél nÓengusa from Óengus Mór mac Eirc, brother of Fergus Mór and Loarn mac Eirc, a relationship which is probably an invention. (Note: Woolf describes Fergus Mór as the "legendary founder of Dál Riata". Hunter says it is "probable" that he left Ulster for Argyll in the late 5th or early 6th century "accompanied by a warrior band". His name does not appear in Fraser (2009) who writes that the Corcu Reti's assumed descent from Domangart Réti represents what their leaders "believed – or wished – was true about their ancestry. Whether or not they were really related in this way is impossible to know.")

Óengus Mór is said to have had two sons, Nadsluaig and Fergna, and their descendants are also listed in the Senchus. It has been suggested that Fergna son of Óengus Mór may be identified with Fergnae mac Oengusso Ibdaig, that is Fergnae son of Óengus the Hebridean. The descendants of this Fergnae, known as the Uí Ibdaig—the descendants of the Hebridean—were counted as a minor branch of the powerful Dál Fiatach of Ulster. Another account suggests Óengus inherited Islay from a Pictish heiress.

The Genelaig Albanensium, a series of genealogies attached to Senchus proper, gives the ancestry of a certain Óengus. This calls him Óengus, son of Boib, son of Rónán, son of Áedán, son of C[h]abléni (the Senchus gives Capléne), son of Nadsluaig, son of Rónán, son of Óengus Mór mac Eirc. In this genealogy, Nadsluaig is a grandson of Óengus Mór, and not his son, otherwise the genealogy in the Senchus matches this as far as Áedán. Marjorie Ogilvie Anderson suggested that this genealogy dates from the early 8th century, as do those given for the other kindreds in the same source, and reflects a second census undertaken at about that time.

The evidence of the main Senchus suggests that that the main line of descent on Islay was from Capléne son of Nadslúaig with a second line from Barrfhind son of Nadslúaig, although it is possible one of these lines was located somewhere else in Argyll/Ulster.

There is evidence of another kin group on Islay – the Cenél Conchride, supposedly descended from a brother of the legendary Fergus Mór, but the existence of the this kindred seems to have been brief.

In 627, the son of a king of the Irish Uí Chóelbad, a branch of the Dál nAraidi kingdom of Ulster (not to be confused with Dál Riata), was killed on Islay at the unidentified location of Ard-Corann by a warrior in an army led by Connad Cerr of the Corcu Réti (possibly the collective term for the Cenél nGabráin and Cenél Comgaill, before they split), based at Dunadd.

Although of a comparable size to the other main kindreds Cenél nÓengusa are the only one from which no historical high kings of Dál Riata are recorded by the Irish annals. However, although prior to the 690s the records contain a listing of the Corcu Réti kings of the Dalriadan realm this may “may represent a partisan estimation of the significance of that kindred in hindsight”. It is possible that prior to that time the Islay kingdom may have been an independent polity for substantial periods.

== Religion ==
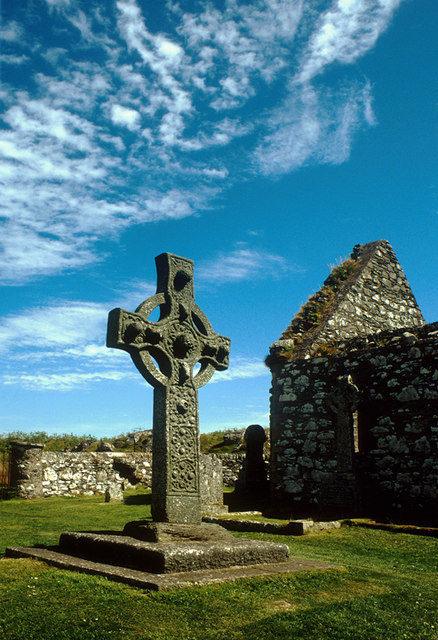
The 8th century Kildalton Cross, which is located in the grounds of a church building that dates to the late 12th or early 13th century.

There are very few historical sources outside the Senchus which refer to the Cenél nÓengusa. Adomnán's hagiography of Columba mentions a rich Islay landowner named Feradach who was tasked with caring for an exiled Pictish nobleman called Taran, but says nothing about the political background on the island.

Dun Fhinn is a short distance from the Kildalton Cross, which is likely to date to the second half of the 8th century. It is believed to stand in its original location, is over 2.5m high and carved from a local chlorite-schist. In style it is an "almost complete ring-headed cross with elaborate decoration on both sides" comparable to several such crosses on Iona and "is the finest example of an intact 8th-century high cross in Scotland".

The Celtic monastic system made use of isolated retreat centres they called 'deserts' and there were several smaller monastic settlements associated with Iona. Tiree had one, the island of Hinba another, (Note: The location of Hinba is much-debated. Youngson writes that "MacEachern is the only scholar to write on the subject who pays any attention at all to the fact that in extract XXI [of his Life of Columba] Adomnán refers to an island called Hinbina - presumably "Little Hinba". Only Colonsay and Oronsay provide a large and little island". Other candidates include Eileach an Naoimh, a rocky islet in the Garvellachs in the Firth of Lorn. Columba is believed to have visited Eileach an Naoimh and it may be the burial site of his mother Eithne.) along with Elene Insula and a location on Skye. Elene Insula was speculatively identified as Nave Island off Islay's northwest coast by W. F. Skene. The discovery of a cross-fragment of probable 5th-century date in the remains of a later religious site along with part of a cross found nearby with a similar date to that of Kildalton "supports an Early Christian origin."

The chief religious site of Cenél Loairn may have been on Lismore. However, most of the early churches on Islay, Jura and Colonsay are dedicated to Columba or one of his followers, a close connection with Iona that Islay may have shared with the mainland Cenél nGabráin, although most of these early buildings are probably from the Norse period. (Note: Finlaggan, in the Loch of the same name, is dedicated to Findlugan, a contemporary of Columba. However there appears to be no evidence linking his name to the site prior to the Viking take-over of Islay. Nonetheless, a bronze brooch with a double animal head design was found in the waters of the loch close to Eilean Mór, which has been dated to 50BC-100CE. Described as a "masterpiece", this hints that the importance of the site long predates both the well-known medieval structures and the early Christian period.) Very little information is available about the religious provision for the laity in Cenél nOengusa territory. The discovery of the 5th century Kilnave cross at the mainland site near Nave Island, which is carved from a thin slab of greenish Torridonian flagstone, may hint at lay worship served from the nearby monastic site.

The late Tripartite Life of Saint Patrick refers to the saint appointing a certain Ném as bishop of Telach in the lands of the Cenél nÓengusa. The cluster of other ‘nave’ place names in the northwest including Ardnave and Ardnave Loch may be an additional indication of Bishop Nem's association with Islay. Ó Ríagáin hypotheses an Uí Nadslúaig stemming from the son (or grandson) of Óengus Mór operating in the north of Ireland of which Ném and Coirpre of Coleraine (another ecclesiastical figure) were part.

== Commerce and agriculture ==
There is no evidence that Islay was ever subject to Roman military control or incursions although small numbers of finds such as a coin and a brooch from the third century AD suggest links of some kind with the intermittent Roman presence on the mainland.

Milk products were probably a mainstay of the diet on Islay at this time and cattle would have played a prominent role in agriculture. Contemporary evidence from Ireland and from Islay at a later date suggest that not only were the herds markers of wealth and status but that the land may have been measured by the number of cattle it could support.

== Later history ==
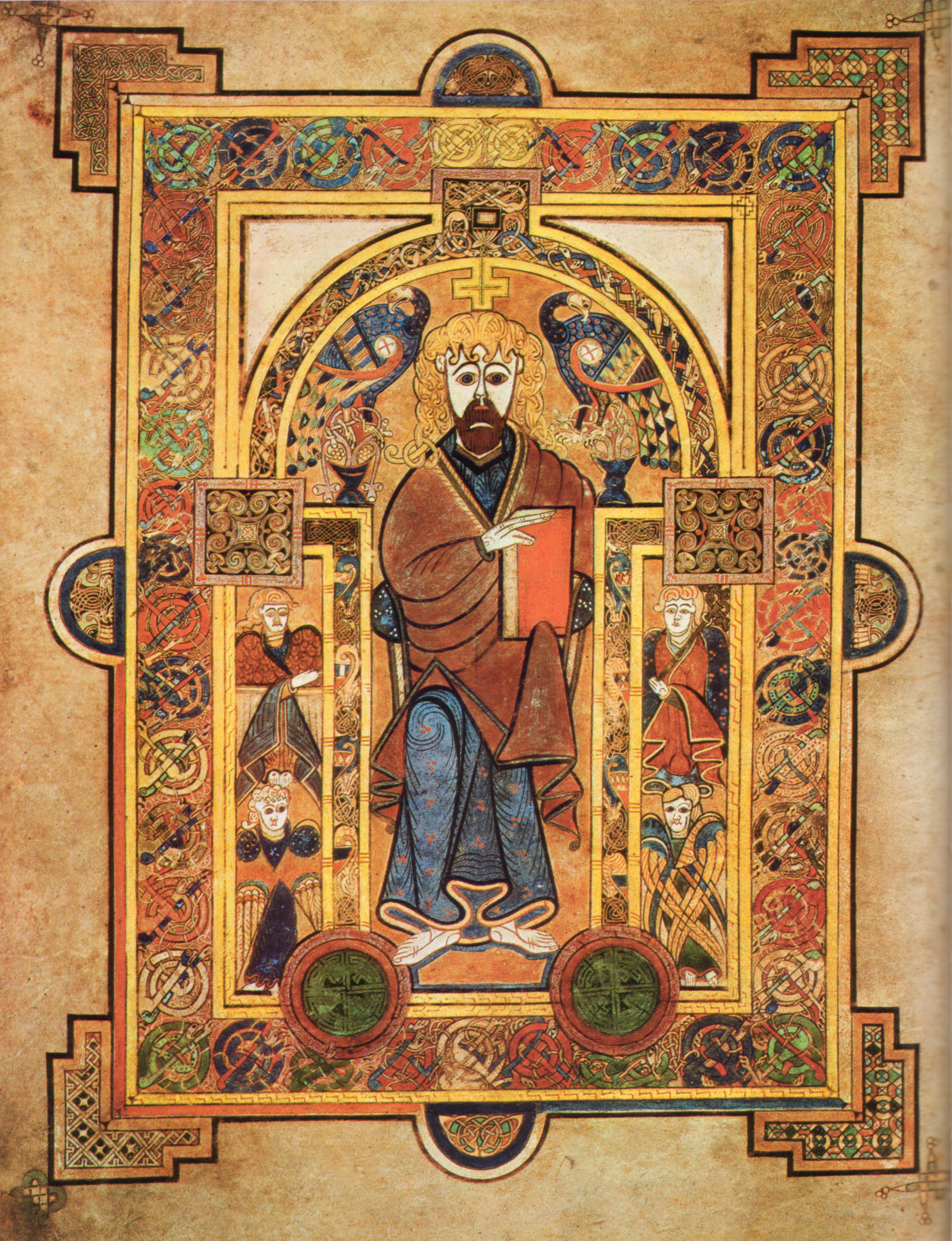
Folio 32v of the Book of Kells which may have been produced by the monks of Iona and taken to Ireland for safekeeping after repeated Viking raids of the Hebrides.

No text called the Iona Chronicle survives today but historians have been able to piece together its contents "imbedded in the medieval Irish chronicle tradition". It was originally complied c.643 with a second phase from 670-c.740 at which point the details of kings, military events etc. slowly peter out. There are however few references to Cenél nÓengusa. It is possible that the battle of 627 referred to above indicates that Islay was absorbed by the Corcu Réti at about this time.

A rare early entry about Islay in the Annals of Ulster refers to an earthquake in 740.

== Viking era ==
With the arrival of Norse raiders on the western seaboard of Scotland towards the end of the 8th century the power of the Gaels in Argyll fell into decline. The king of Fortriu, Eógan mac Óengusa, and the king of Dál Riata, Áed mac Boanta, were among the dead after a major defeat by the Vikings in 839. At some point in the 9th century, the beleaguered kingdom of Dál Riata lost the Hebrides to the Vikings, when Ketil Flatnose is said to have founded the Kingdom of the Isles. (Note: Hunter states that Ketil was "in charge of an extensive island realm and, as a result, sufficiently prestigious to contemplate the making of agreements and alliances with other princelings", but stops short of describing him as a monarch.)

Kingships of Dál Riata are recorded after this time but the heritage of these later rulers is not clear and only a probably fabricated pedigree has survived linking the Cenél nGabráin with the later House of Alpin and the Kings of Scotland.

== Legacy ==
It is possible that the modern names of Angus and Gowrie in eastern Scotland reflect the movement of Cenél nÓengusa and Cenél nGabráin refugees fleeing Norse incursions in the west. Similarly, Cenél Loairn populations may have re-settled in Moray.

Argyll folklore and medieval chronicles claim the 12th century king of the Isles Somerled as a descendant of the much earlier Islay kindreds, and from Somerled came the Lords of the Isles and Clan Donald. Historians have been cautious about accepting these assertions.

The modern arms of Clan Donald

There are several different lineages in existence for Somerled at least two of which, (The Great Book of Lecan and The Ó Cianáin Miscellany) trace his ancestry to Fergus, son of Erc, evidently Fergus Mór and Erc of Dalriata. However, these lineages are much too short to cover the six centuries between the death of Fergus and the birth of Somerled and the earliest names of those listed were probably inserted to imply equivalence between Clan Somhairle and the kings of Scots. Sellar describes the tracing back of Somerled's ancestry to Fergus Mór and beyond as a "preposterous fiction" but accepts "the authenticity of the pedigree, in detail back to the beginning of the ninth century".

Woolf (2005) has suggested an interpretation involving three parts: this early section, a late section including Somerled's ancestors who were known of at the time of writing and a more speculative middle section linking the other two. In this version of events Gofraid mac Fergusa is an invented figure who is conflated with both the historical Gofraid ua Ímair (d. 934) and Godred Crovan (d. 1095). The latter was a Norse-Gaelic ruler of the kingdoms of Dublin and the Isles and the founder of the Crovan dynasty. Although his parentage is uncertain, he was an Uí Ímair dynast, and a descendant of Amlaíb Cúarán, King of Northumbria and Dublin.

Somerled's claim to the isles was based on his descent from this dynasty and with reference to this heritage Dean Monro, writing in the mid-16th century in the Description of the Western Isles of Scotland, stated that until the early part of that century Clan Donald "wer called at that tyme Clan Gothofreid, that is Clangotheray in hybers leid". The writers of these genealogies may have inserted Gofraid mac Fergusa as a means of creating links to the earlier rulers of Dál Riata, strengthening their ties to Gaeldom and obscuring the reality that Clann Somhairle's descent from Godred Crovan involved a female line cadet branch of the Uí Ímair.

== See also ==
- Origins of the Kingdom of Alba
- List of monarchs of Scotland
- Scottish island names
