= Ardtalla =

Area on the Isle of Islay, Scotland

Coordinates: 55.718°N 6.036°W

Ardtalla: Scottish Gaelic: Àird Talla
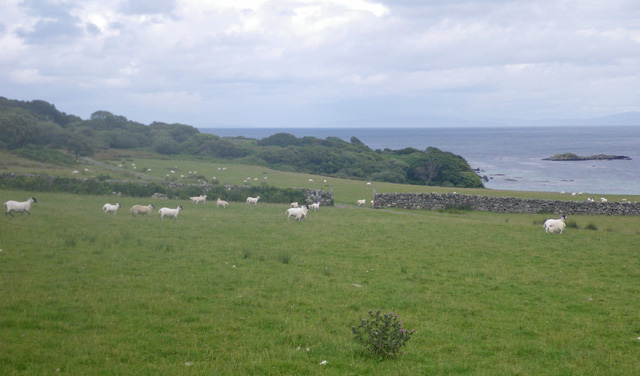
- Sheep grazing on the Ardtalla Estate

- Location within Argyll and Bute
- OS grid reference: NR4654
- Council area: Argyll and Bute
- Lieutenancy area: Argyll and Bute
- Country: Scotland
- Sovereign state: United Kingdom
- Post town: ISLE OF ISLAY
- Postcode district: PA42
- Police: Scotland
- Fire: Scottish
- Ambulance: Scottish
- UK Parliament: Argyll, Bute and South Lochaber
- Scottish Parliament: Argyll and Bute

Ardtalla (Scottish Gaelic: 'Àird Talla') is a place name and estate in the southeast coastal area of Islay, Scotland. The name derives from Gaelic Àird, a "point", and talla, a now obsolete word for rock, not "high grave" as suggested by some. A well-defined track emanates from the Ardtalla Estate encountering coastal scenery and an Iron Age fort.

== Historical perspective ==
According to Roger Redfern, Saint Columba landed nearby at Ardmore Point on his historic journey from Ireland around the Hebrides. In Redfern's book, Walking in the Hebrides, he details scenic and historic elements in and around the Ardtalla Estate.

Recorded mention of Ardtalla traces back at least as far as the latter 18th century. As early as during the 18th century, the literature notes that local people on Islay did not consider Ardtalla a remote location, ostensibly due to the level of improvement of the coastal access road connecting Ardtalla to Port Ellen.

== In music ==
Ardtalla has been the subject of musical compositions, notably including James MacMillan's composition The Road to Ardtalla composed for chamber sextet in 1983 and premiered at the Manchester University Concert Hall at the Manchester University on 6 October 1987.

== See also ==
- Claggain Bay
- Kildalton Cross
