= Beinn Bheigeir =

Hill on the island of Islay in Scotland

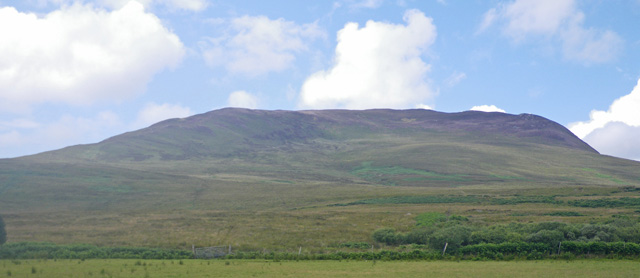
- Southeast facing slopes of Beinn Bheigeir

Highest point
- Elevation: 491 m (1,611 ft)
- Prominence: 491 m (1,611 ft)
- Parent peak: none - HP Islay
- Listing: Marilyn, Hardy
- Coordinates: 55°43′57″N 06°05′49″W

Geography
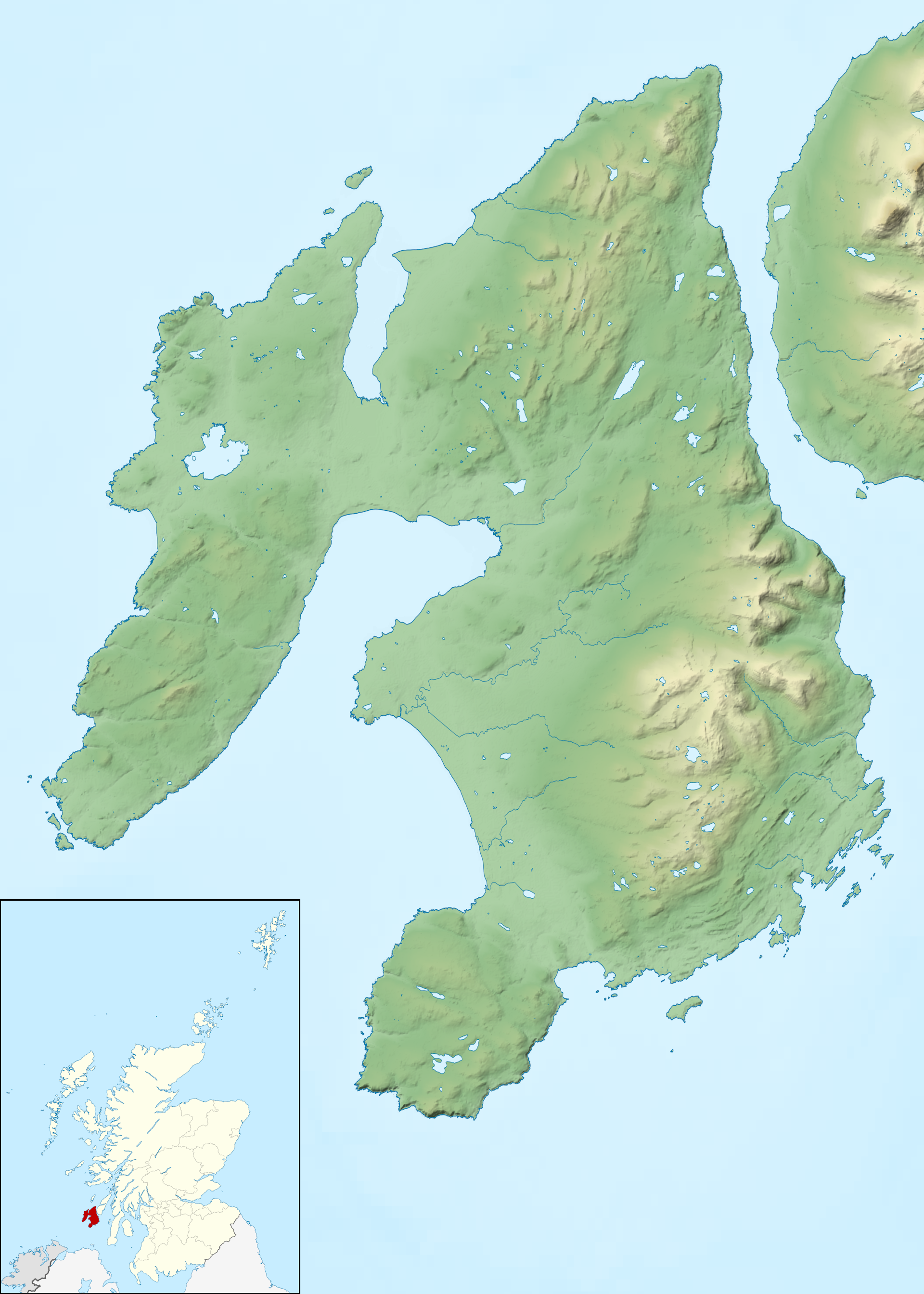
- Location within Islay
- Location: Argyll and Bute, Scotland
- Parent range: Islay
- OS grid: NR429564

Beinn Bheigeir (occasionally anglicised as "Ben Vicar") is a hill on the island of Islay in Scotland. At 491 m, it is the highest of the seven 'Marilyn' hills on Islay, and the highest point on the island.

It is in the south east of Islay in the Ardtalla Estate. One possible approach is from Ardtalla: Start by following the path north towards Proaig, then turn west towards Beinn Bheigier. Once some height is gained turn northwest to walk around the hill towards Bealach Corrach. Walk west towards the bealach, then steeply climb up to reach the summit.

A trig point marks the summit. On a clear day views include the island of Jura with the Paps of Jura, Kintyre, the Isle of Arran and most of Islay.

== See also ==
- List of islands by highest point
