= Loch an t-Sailein =

Sea loch at the southeast coast of Islay, Scotland

Coordinates: 55°38′43″N 6°05′17″W

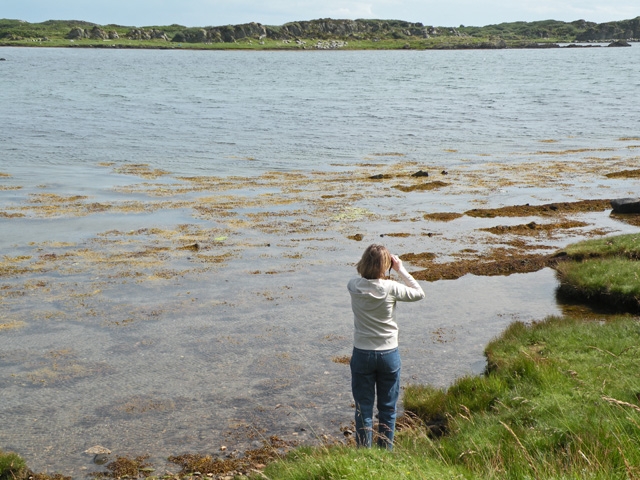
Seal watching at Loch an t-Sailein.

Loch an t-Sailein is a sea loch at the southeast coast of Islay, Scotland. European seals frequently visit the shallow waters of this loch. A number of bird species are found along the shores of Loch an t-Sailein. The southeast coast of Islay has a highly irregular shoreline with many lochs and bays including Aros Bay somewhat to the east.

== See also ==
- Ardbeg, Islay
