= The Oa =

Peninsula in the southwest of Islay, Argyll and Bute, Scotland

Coordinates: 55°37′N 6°17′W

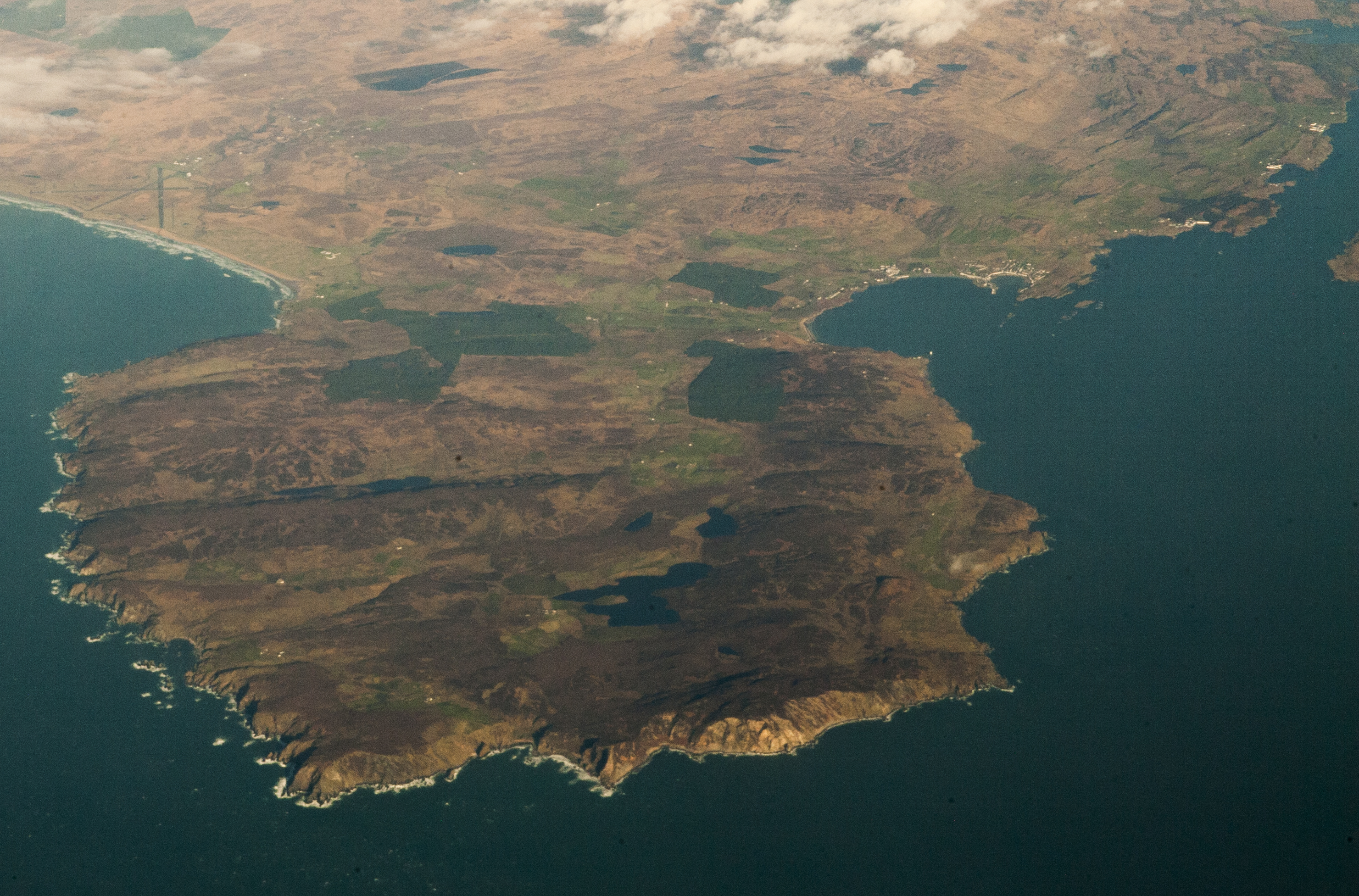
The Oa peninsula, from the air, in 2014. Port Ellen is on the bay in the upper right. Islay Airport is at the top left.

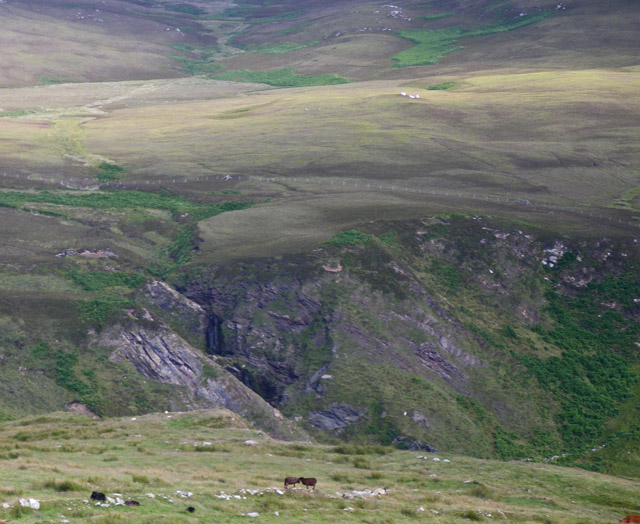
Waterfall at the Mull of Oa

The Oa (/ˈoʊ/ OH) (Scottish Gaelic: An Obha) is a rocky peninsula in the southwest of the island of Islay, in Argyll, Scotland. It is an RSPB nature reserve.

== Area ==
The area is roughly circular, with a radius of about 4 km, and connects with the rest of the island at a neck about 4 km across, which runs between Kintra and Port Ellen. Its high point is Beinn Mhòr (202 metres or 663 feet) near the cliff top on the south coast. The Oa had a population of 800 in 1830, but became deserted due to the Highland Clearances.

The American Monument was erected on the south coast by the American Red Cross to commemorate the loss of two ships in 1918 – the liner Tuscania and the armed merchant cruiser HMS Otranto. It lies at the end of the only road in the Oa.

The area around the memorial is an RSPB nature reserve, where chough, golden eagles, corn crakes, and sea birds can be seen. 1,931 hectares (4,770 acres) have been designated as a Special Protection Area for the protection of the chough.

Ireland can be seen from the south coast on a clear day.
