= Machrie golf course =

Golf course in Argyll and Bute, Scotland

Coordinates: 55.662°N 6.256°W

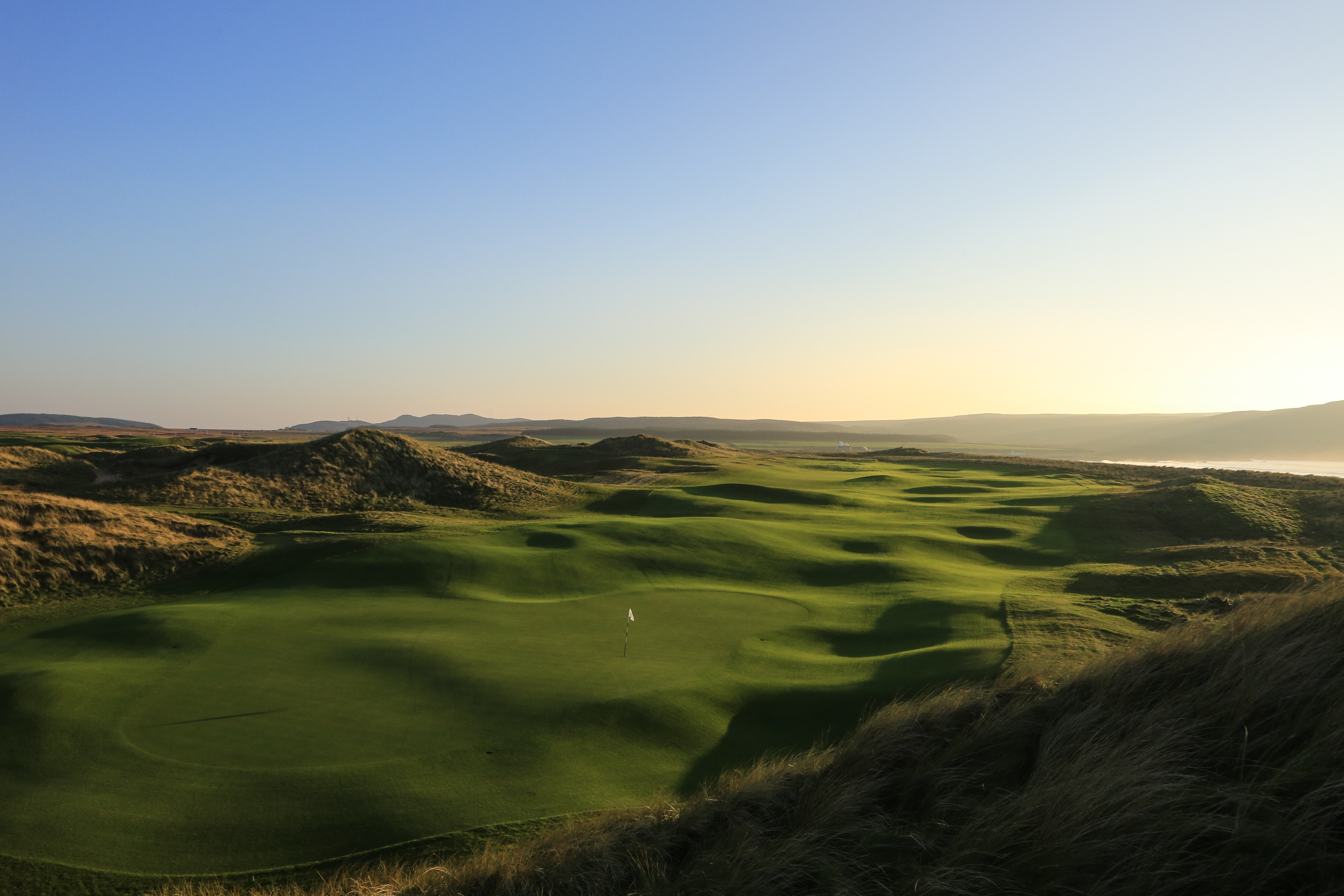
The Machrie Links

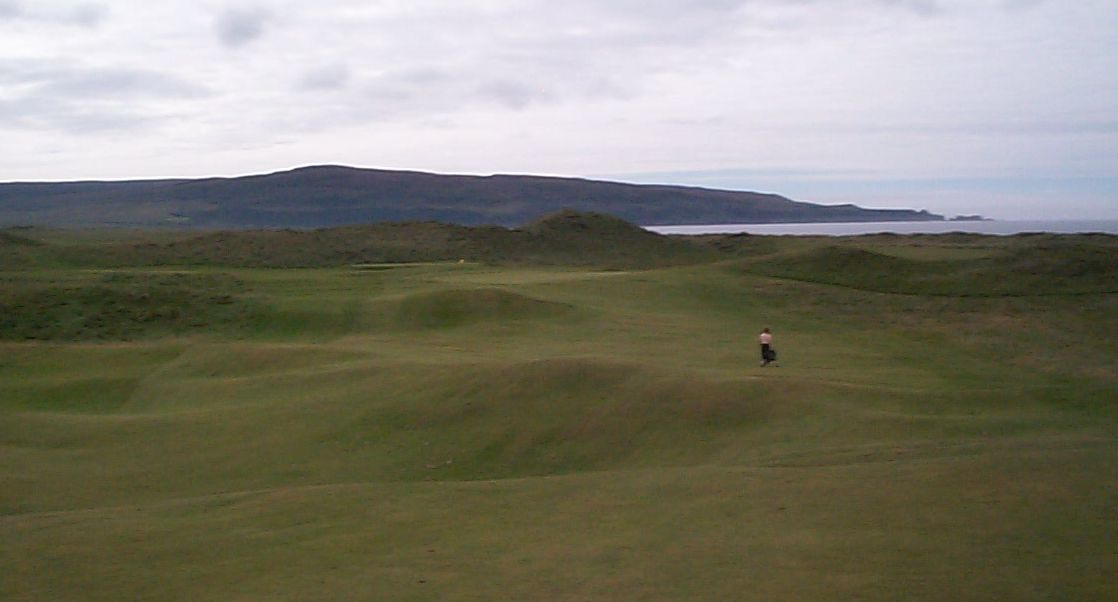
Machrie Golf Links

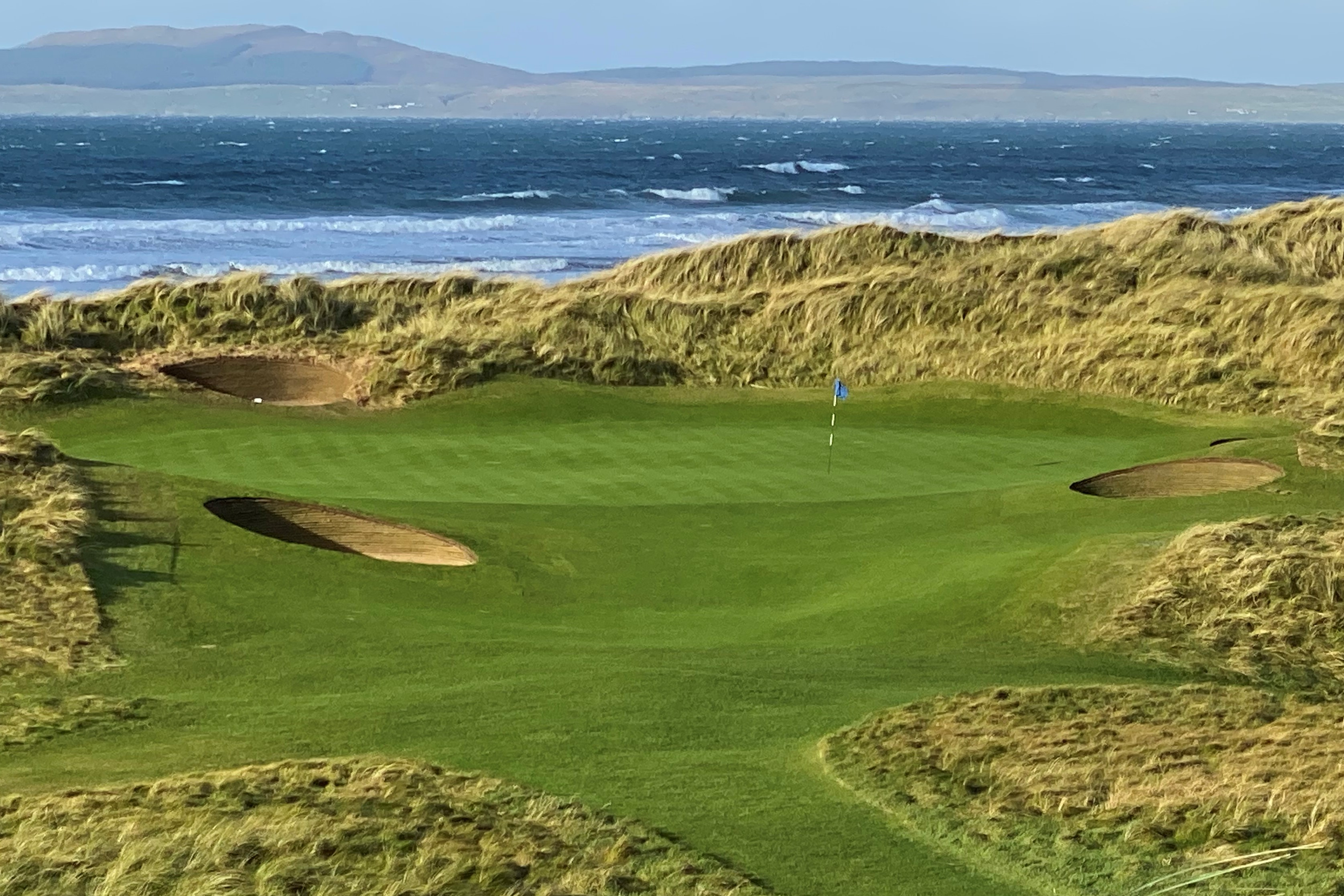
The Machrie Links

The Machrie Golf Course, or "The Machrie Links", is located on Islay, in Scotland. The word "machrie" is a corruption of the Scottish Gaelic machair, which means more or less the same as "links" did on the east coast of Scotland.

The Machrie is a Scottish Championship links style golf course. stretching to 7024 yards from the back tees. An original Willie Campbell design dating back to 1891 it was intentionally made long, at least by 19th Century standards, to attract golfers to Islay. The course was unusual in that its layout crosses the dunes instead of running alongside them like most links courses do, which resulted in multiple blind shots.

The Machrie Links hosted a famous match in 1901 between James Braid, John Henry Taylor and Harry Vardon for a prize of £100, reputed to be the largest prize of its kind at that time in the British Isles. Harry Vardon called Mount Zion, originally the first hole, "the hardest hole I have seen". The links later hosted the Western Isles Open Championship in June 1935.

== Major updates ==
The Links was acquired by Gavyn Davies and his wife Susan Nye, Baroness Nye in 2011; it had been placed in administration in late 2010. The course was redesigned recently, by architect David J. Russell, and reopened in May 2017. The overall rating by Golf World Top 100 in 2019 was 80.6%. The publication's review that discussed the significant design changes included this comment: "Russell’s routing has a much greater number of expansive views of the sea on the front nine. The internal out of bounds has also gone. Lots of the blind shots have [gone] too." After the redesign, the web site Top 100 Golf Courses rated this one as #21 in Scotland in 2019.

In addition to the 18-hole Links, the facility offers a Wee course (six par-3 holes) a covered driving range, a short game area and the Hebrides putting course. The new version of the Machrie Hotel, now has 47 bedrooms, including 4 2-bedroom lodges; it opened in 2018, replacing a predecessor, that was described as "dilapidated". The previous Machrie hotel had 16 bedrooms and 15 separate lodges.

The Islay Golf Club is a privately owned club founded in 1891, which has its home at the Machrie Golf Links for its members.
