= Claggain Bay =

Bay in Argyll and Bute, Scotland

Coordinates: 55.7069°N 6.0361°W

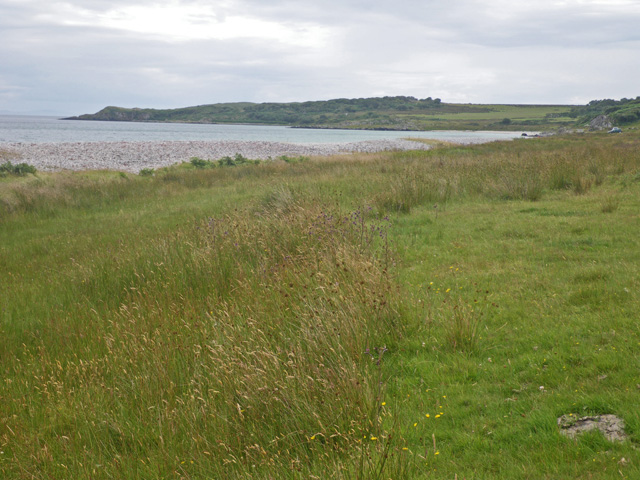
Coastal meadow above Claggain Bay. Image author: C. Michael Hogan

Claggain Bay is an inlet on the southeast of Islay, Scotland. A well known walking path follows near to Claggain Bay and continues to Ardtalla.

== See also ==
- Aros Bay
