= Kildalton Cross =

Monolithic high cross in Celtic cross form in the Inner Hebrides, Scotland

- Kildalton Cross AD 800 Islay, Scotland
- Created: Eighth Century CE
- Present location: Islay, Inner Hebrides, Scotland
- Coordinates: 55°41′2″N 6°2′40″W

Designations

Scheduled monument
- Official name: Kildalton Church and High Cross
- Type: Crosses and carved stones: cross (free-standing); tombstone, Ecclesiastical: burial ground, cemetery, graveyard; church
- Designated: 19 March 2013
- Reference no.: SM13236

The Kildalton Cross is a monolithic high cross in Celtic cross form in the churchyard of the former parish church of Kildalton (from Scottish Gaelic Cill Daltain, "Church of the Foster Son" (i.e. St John the Evangelist) on the island of Islay in the Inner Hebrides, Scotland. It was carved probably in the second half of the 8th century AD, and is closely related to crosses of similar date on Iona. It is often considered the finest surviving Celtic cross in Scotland, and is certainly one of the most perfect monuments of its date to survive in western Europe. The cross and the adjacent roofless medieval parish church are in the care of Historic Environment Scotland (access at all times) and are jointly a scheduled monument. A simpler cross of late medieval date stands nearby.

== Ornament ==
The Kildalton Cross features an iconic image of the Virgin and Child, which is closely related to similar Virgin and Child iconography found on St. Martin's Cross and St. Oran's Cross at Iona. In addition, this panel displays similarities with folio 7v in the Book of Kells. This type of iconography of the Virgin and Child may be related to contemporary Marian iconography in the Mediterranean, specifically the Maria Regina which was used in Rome to refute iconoclasm.

== See also ==
- Aros Bay
