= Dun Nosebridge =

Human settlement in Argyll and Bute, Scotland, UK

Coordinates: 55.7628°N 6.1920°W

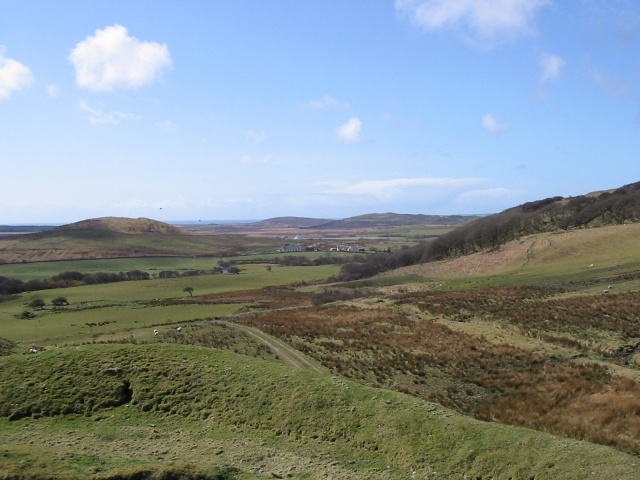
Looking south west from Dun Nosebridge.

Dun Nosebridge is an Iron Age fort southeast of Bridgend, Islay, Scotland. The fort is on the right bank of the River Laggan.

The name's origin is probably a mixture of Scottish Gaelic and Old Norse: Dun in the former language means "fort" and knaus-borg in the latter means "fort on the crag". Another possibility is the Norse hnaus-bog meaning "turf fort".

The site is a designated scheduled monument.
