= Aros Bay =

Embayment near the southeast of Islay, Scotland

Coordinates: 55.6963°N 6.0315°W

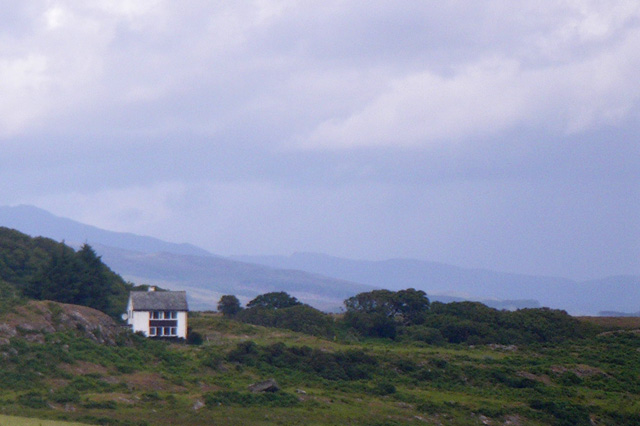
Hills above Aros Bay. Image author: C. Michael Hogan

Aros Bay is an embayment of ocean waters near the southeast of Islay, Scotland.

== See also ==
- Claggain Bay
