= Hungarian Protestant Congregation of Belgium =

Hungarian-speaking congregation of the United Protestant Church in Belgium

- Type: Western Christianity
- Classification: Protestantism
- Scripture: Protestant Bible
- Full communion: United Protestant Church in Belgium
- Region: Belgium
- Language: Hungarian
- Official website: www.protestans.be

The Hungarian Protestant Congregation of Belgium (Hungarian: Belgiumi Magyar Protestáns Gyülekezet; French: Congrégation Protestante Hongroise de Belgique; Dutch: Hongaarse Protestantse Congregatie van België) is Hungarian-speaking congregation of the United Protestant Church in Belgium. It is based in Brussels and brings together mainly Reformed Christians of Hungarian origin.

== History ==
The congregation was founded in the 1920s by Hungarians who had emigrated to Belgium, most of whom had left Hungary after the World War I. The community received new waves of members after the World War II and the Hungarian Revolution of 1956, when large numbers of refugees fled to Western Europe.

András Pándy, a serial killer, served in this community in the 1980s.

== See also ==
- András Pándy
- United Protestant Church in Belgium
