= András Pándy =

Belgian murderer (1927 - 2013)

- Born: András Pándy; 1 June 1927; Čop, Czechoslovakia (now Chop, Ukraine)
- Died: 23 December 2013 (aged 86); Bruges, Belgium
- Convictions: Murder (6 counts); Attempted murder Rape (3 counts)
- Penalty: Life imprisonment

Details
- Victims: 6–14+
- Span of crimes: 1986–1990
- Country: Belgium
- Date apprehended: October 1997

András Pándy (1 June 1927 – 23 December 2013) was a Hungarian-Belgian pastor and a serial killer, convicted for the murder of six family members in Brussels between 1986 and 1990.

Originally from Hungary, Pándy is believed to have killed his wife, ex-wife, two biological children, and two step-children who disappeared mysteriously, with the assistance of his daughter, Ágnes. Additionally, he started abusive incestuous relationships with Ágnes and a third step-child who survived. In 1992, Belgian and Hungarian police began investigating Pándy, which resulted in his arrest in 1997 and conviction in 2002. Furthermore, the skeletal remains of seven more unknown women and one man were found in one of his houses. A religious teacher and clergyman, he was dubbed "Father Bluebeard" by some of the Belgian press.

Pándy was serving a life sentence without parole when he died on 23 December 2013.

== Early life and marriages ==
Pándy was born on 1 June 1927, in Chop, Carpathian Ruthenia (then under Czechoslovak administration), a village just across the border from Hungary, to Hungarian parents. Pándy was a church councillor for the Reformed Church in Hungary when he met his first wife, Ilona Sőrés. Following the failed Hungarian Revolution of 1956, they fled to Belgium, where Pándy became a pastor for a small Hungarian Protestant community in Brussels and a religious teacher for the United Protestant Church.

The couple had a daughter, Ágnes, born in 1957, followed by two sons: Dániel (born 1961) and Zoltán (1966). Shortly after the birth of Zoltán, the couple separated when Pándy accused his wife of infidelity. Ilona moved out of the house with their sons, leaving daughter Ágnes behind with Pándy. Then 11 years old, Ágnes soon became the victim of an incestuous relationship with her father.

At the beginning of the 1970s, Pándy began courting women through dating services in Hungarian newspapers, often providing a false name and job description while using the phrase "European Honeymoon". By the end of the decade, he began regularly visiting Hungary again and met his future second wife, Edit Fintor. A married woman, Fintor had three daughters from two previous marriages: 15-year-old Tímea, eight-year-old Tünde, and seven-year-old Andrea. Fintor's then-husband claimed that Pándy had seduced his wife, who eloped with him to Belgium along with her children, where they married in 1979 after Pándy's divorce from Ilona Sőrés was finalized. Shortly after Pándy and Fintor's marriage, they had two children: a son named András Jr., and a daughter named Reka.

Family tree circa 1980

Ilona Sőrés		András Pándy			Edit Fintor		previous husbands
Ágnes	Dániel	Zoltán	András Jr.	Reka	Tímea	Tünde	Andrea

In 1984, Pándy started a second abusive incestuous relationship with his step-daughter, the now 20-year-old Tímea, whom he had impregnated after raping her. Tímea's claims of sexual abuse were brushed off by her family members, who claimed that she had probably used a towel containing Pándy's semen to impregnate herself. She was sent to live in a different house with Ágnes, and in what was believed to be a fit of jealousy, Ágnes tried to bludgeon Tímea to death with an iron bar in the basement of the home, until she stopped when startled by something. After being hospitalized, Tímea attempted to report her abuse but found her claims once again dismissed; she later gave birth to a son, Marc. In 1986 Tímea escaped from her family, first staying with relatives in Vancouver, British Columbia, Canada, before starting a new life in Hungary.

== Disappearances ==
Shortly before running away to Vancouver, Tímea had told her mother that Pándy had been sexually abusing her and was the father of her son. This sparked a fierce argument between Fintor and Pándy, soon after which Fintor and the now 14-year-old Andrea disappeared. Pándy told the police that Fintor had left him and moved to Germany with a new lover, using a forged telegram as evidence.

Two years later in 1988, twenty years after their separation, Pándy's ex-wife Ilona and their two sons disappeared. Pándy first claimed that they had moved to France, but then changed this to South America.

By 1990, Fintor's 18-year-old daughter Tünde was still alive and living with Pándy many years after the disappearance of her mother and sister. Pándy sent Ágnes away on a vacation with his younger children, András Jr. and Reka, only for her to find upon her return that Tünde had also disappeared. Ágnes was told by Pándy that Tünde had become "disturbed" and been sent to live with another family.

== Investigation, arrest and conviction ==
Previous police investigation of the disappearances was very limited and low-effort, as Pándy avoided suspicion by using false testimony and forged evidence to trick the police into believing the victims had simply migrated away from Belgium.

In 1992, two years after the last disappearance, Ágnes attempted to report her father to the police for sexual abuse. Although no real action was taken at first, suspicion against Pándy gradually increased and the police interest in the disappearances grew. Hungarian police became involved in the investigation due to the possibility that Pándy was connected to cases of many missing women in Hungary. He frequently visited Hungary, owning a summer home near the River Danube, and during his trips he was known to charm local women and offer to take them with him to Brussels. This theory led the two police forces to begin a joint investigation.

Later, two siblings from the town, Eva Kincs and Margit Magyar, both claimed to have separately accepted Pándy's offer in the hopes of becoming his wife. According to the two women, they were locked in the Brussels home by Pándy and forced to cook and clean, telling them that they would raise suspicions if they wandered out on the streets unable to speak anything but Hungarian. After rejecting separate marriage proposals, the women demanded he send them back to Hungary, which he did.

The United Protestant Church in Belgium, Pándy's employer, had never made an official complaint against him in his role as a teacher and Protestant pastor. However his colleague, the Dutch minister Andries den Broer, apparently became aware in 1988 of abuses at home and the lack of police interest. Andries supposedly wrote to the Belgian Ministry of Justice and Queen Fabiola because of his suspicions, but received no answers. By 1996, it was discovered that Pándy had submitted false testimony and fake letters.

Pándy was arrested on 16 October 1997—coincidentally the same date as the "White March", a large demonstration for the victims of another Belgian serial killer Marc Dutroux, who had sexually abused and killed several girls in Charleroi a few years prior. The Dutroux case was controversial in Belgium, and brought police incompetence and corruption into the national spotlight. Like Dutroux's case, Pándy's case had worldwide media coverage, especially after Pándy's deadpan reaction to his surroundings.

=== Ágnes's confession ===
In November 1997, Ágnes herself was arrested by the police, and a few days later confessed to participating with her father in most of the murders of her missing relatives. According to Ágnes, she was solely responsible for the murder of her mother Ilona, and took part in the murders of Dániel, Zoltán, Edit and Andrea, but was not involved in (and possibly unaware of) Tünde's death. It is believed that the killing of Tünde was the only murder Pándy had committed without Ágnes's assistance. The modus operandi presented by Ágnes was, in at least two cases, murder by a handgun, and head trauma caused by a sledgehammer. The corpses were dismembered, partly dissolved in a bath filled with Liquid-Plumr (chemical drain cleaner) in the basement, and then the remaining parts were taken to a local abattoir in Anderlecht for disposal.

=== Trial and sentencing ===
Pándy denied the charges, but largely due to Ágnes's testimony and assistance, enough evidence was gathered to convict him. In court, Pándy dismissed the proceedings as a "witch trial" against him, and told the jury that the alleged dead were still alive and that he was "in contact with them through angels." When asked why the missing family members could not be traced in four years of searching, Pándy replied: "It is up to justice to prove they are dead. When I'm free again, they will come and visit me."

On March 6, 2002, a Belgian court convicted Pándy for the murder of six family members, attempted murder, and the rape of three of his daughters. Pándy was sentenced to life imprisonment without parole, and housed in Leuven Centraal prison before being moved to a prison in Bruges for health reasons. In 2007, when he turned 80, prison authorities had considered re-housing him in a retirement home.

Ágnes Pándy, by then 44 years old, received a 21-year sentence for being an accomplice in five murders and one attempted murder. Prosecutors had requested a 29-year sentence for Ágnes, but her defense lawyers pushed for leniency, saying Ágnes had been under the "overwhelming irresistible spell" of a father who was raping her and coerced her into collaborating in the killings of her mother and siblings. Ágnes said in her closing statement: "I had no way out. I was completely in his grip".

András Pándy died on 23 December 2013, from natural causes in the Bruges prison infirmary.

== Aftermath and possible additional murders ==
=== Molenbeek-Saint-Jean residences ===
Pándy owned several homes within the Molenbeek-Saint-Jean area in Brussels, along the River Senne. This included rowhouses on Vandemaelen Street, Nijverheidskaai/Quai de l'Industrie (where the majority of the murders had occurred), and Vandenbrande Street.

During an excavation at the home on Vandemaelen Street following Pándy's arrest, the skeletal remains of seven women and one man of unknown origin were discovered within the concrete of the home's basement. In January 1998 DNA profiling of the bone fragments revealed that the deceased were not relatives of Pándy, and it remains unclear if their deaths were related to the case at all. Due to Pándy's prolific uses of Hungarian dating services, there are suspicions that they were the skeletons of Hungarian women brought to Belgium. During an investigation of the home on Vandenbrande Street, several firearms, including three rifles and four handguns, were found stashed in a hidden compartment built into the ceiling. The Valdemaelen Street and Nijverheidskaai/Quai de l'Industrie houses were later demolished.

=== Possible additional murders ===
After his arrest, further investigations were conducted to determine if Pándy and Ágnes had committed several additional murders of non-relatives, before and during the killing of their family members. On 26 November 1997, a month after his arrest, the Hungarian newspaper Népszava reported that Pándy had fostered an unknown number of Romanian children—orphan refugees from the 1989 revolution that toppled communist dictator Nicolae Ceaușescu—at his home in Brussels. The children were supposedly recruited by a charity called YDNAP (Pándy spelt backwards), and Népszava reported that "nobody knows what happened to them or if they returned home" to Romania. Police also linked Ágnes to the 1993 disappearance of a 12-year-old girl whose mother was romantically involved with Pándy.

== See also ==
- Bluebeard (disambiguation)
- List of serial killers by country
- List of serial killers by number of victims
- Marc Dutroux
