= Kilarrow Parish Church =

Church in Argyll and Bute, Scotland

Coordinates: 55°45′18″N 6°17′6″W

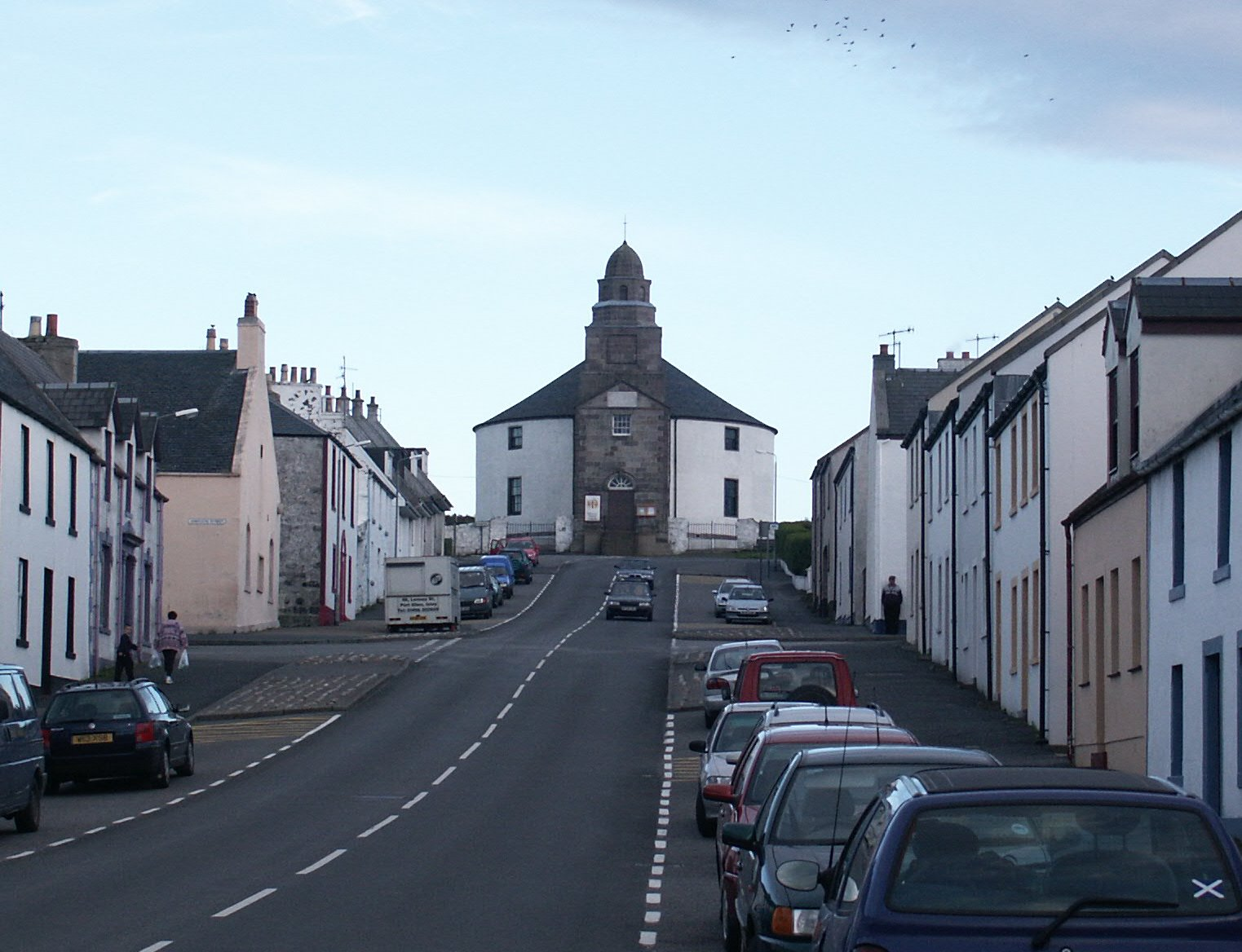
Kilarrow Parish Church, Bowmore, Islay

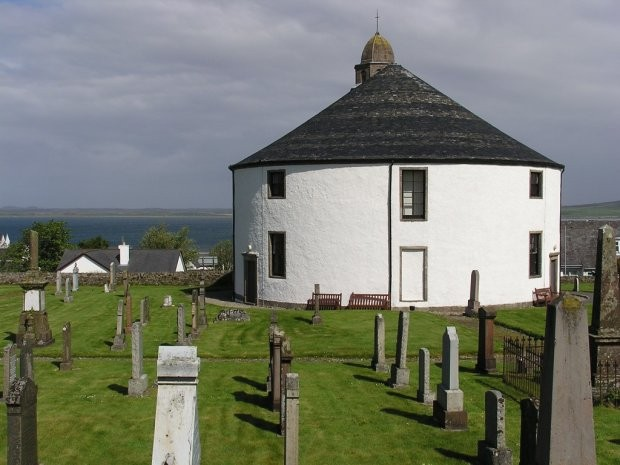
The rear of the church

Kilarrow Church (Scottish Gaelic: Eaglais Cill an Rubha) is a Church of Scotland parish church, overlooking and serving Bowmore on the island of Islay.

The "Round Church", as it is often known, was built in 1767. It has a highly unusual circular design, copied by some churches built in the 1960s. It has been suggested that the circular design was intended to ensure that there were no corners in which the devil could hide. The roof is supported by a single massive central pillar.

The Church also contains some artifacts belonging to the Bowmore-born Rev Donald Caskie (1902–1983), former minister of The Scots Kirk, Paris and notable as the "Tartan Pimpernel" for aiding over 2,000 Allied personnel in their escape from occupied France.

The linked parishes of Kilarrow and Kilmeny are vacant following a reallocation of Ministers.

== See also ==
- List of Church of Scotland parishes
