= Donald Caskie =

Scottish minister (1902-1983)

Donald Currie Caskie

Personal life
- Born: 22 May 1902 Bowmore, Islay, Scotland
- Died: 27 December 1983 (aged 81) Greenock, Scotland

Religious life
- Religion: Church of Scotland

Senior posting
- Post: The Scots Kirk, Paris, 1938–1940, 1945–1961

Donald Currie Caskie, OBE, DD (22 May 1902 – 27 December 1983) was a minister in the Church of Scotland, best known for his work in France during World War II. In Marseille from 1940 to 1942 he presided over the British Seaman's Mission which housed, fed, and clothed British soldiers and airmen stranded in France after the German victory over France in June 1940. He was a member of the Pat O'Leary escape line which helped more than 600 Allied sailors, soldiers and airmen, plus many civilians, to escape from Occupied France (mainly through Spain).

In April 1942, Caskie was arrested by the Vichy France police but allowed to live in Grenoble where he continued his work helping stranded soldiers and airmen. In 1943, he was arrested again and condemned to death by the German occupiers of France. He was saved by the intervention of a German pastor. He spent the remainder of World War II in prison.

The 'Fasti' – the record of all Church of Scotland ministers since the Reformation – simply mentions that he was "engaged in church and patriotic duties in France, 1939–1945".

== Early life ==
The son of a crofter, he was born in Bowmore on Islay in 1902. He was one of eight children of Neil Caskie and Margaret Currie. He was educated at Bowmore School and then Dunoon Grammar School before studying arts and divinity at the University of Edinburgh (1923-1926) and New College, Edinburgh (1926-1928). His first charge was at Gretna. A 2001 Gaelic-language documentary aired on BBC2 stated that Caskie was a homosexual, with the documentarian Angus Peter Campbell saying that Caskie lived life as a man who was "straight at home [and] gay abroad".

== World War II ==
In 1938, Caskie became the minister of the Scots Kirk (church) in Paris. He preached against Nazi Germany and found it expedient to flee Paris on 11 June 1940 as the conquering German army approached the city. He was one of millions who fled the Nazi invasion. Caskie ended up in Marseille along with many stranded British soldiers after the British withdrew their army from France in the Dunkirk Evacuation. On 22 June France surrendered to Germany, but the surrender agreement left Marseille and southern France (Vichy France) unoccupied by the Germans. Arthur Dean, working at the American Consulate in Marseille (The U.S. was still a neutral in the conflict), offered Caskie the job of running the British Seaman's Mission located in a large, run-down building at 46 Rue de Forbin. On 16 July Caskie and three stranded British sailors began cleaning up the building. Mindful that the Vichy government dictated the internment of an estimated 5,000 British soldiers stranded in southern France and that aid to soldiers would be illegal, he posted a sign on the door of the Mission: "Now open to British civilians and seamen ONLY." His intention, however, was to help the stranded soldiers as well as other British citizens in Marseille. He began hiding soldiers in the basement of the Mission, renamed the British and American Seaman's Mission. Up to 100 men slept in the Mission. Security precautions were elementary. Three knocks on the door and the password "Donald Duck" gained entrance.

Caskie fed, housed, and dressed soldiers -- replacing their uniforms with civilian clothing and claiming to the authorities that they were civilians. Although suspicious of Caskie's Mission and occasionally raiding it, the Vichy police allowed it to continue to operate but they collected most British soldiers in Marseille and interned them at Fort Saint-Jean. The interned soldiers were allowed to leave the fort on parole in the evenings. The British government, through the American Consulate, provided a financial stipend to the interned soldiers and also to Caskie for his help to the "civilians" he housed and fed. The people who supported Caskie with funds and also housed soldiers included Louis Nouveau, a French businessman, and his wife Renée and George Rodocanachi, a medical doctor of Greek origin, and his wife Fanny, plus a number of British women living in Marseille.

Among the soldiers Caskie met were James Langley, who would escape France, return to Britain, and become an officer along with Airey Neave (another escapee), of MI9, created to help stranded soldiers and airmen escape countries occupied by Germany. Another was Ian Garrow, Scottish as was Caskie, who would create what became known as the Pat O'Leary Escape Line. The Pat Line, with help from Caskie, would help more than 600 British soldiers and airmen escape France.

=== Detention ===
The Vichy government, under pressure from the Germans, became increasingly intolerant of Caskie's activities and arrested him in April 1942. He was told to leave France, but he refused and instead was allowed to relocate to Grenoble. Before leaving he dispersed the sixty airmen then living at the Mission to safe houses and ensured they had proper, civilian clothing to cross the Pyrenees into Spain. Donald Lowrie of the Quaker mission in Marseille helped him close out the affairs of the Mission.

In Grenoble, Caskie was employed by the university, and acted as a chaplain for interned British soldiers and resident British civilians. He continued to help British soldiers escape France. In November 1942, the Germans occupied Vichy France, ending the relative tolerance of the Vichy police for Caskie's activities. Grenoble was in a region of France occupied by Italy, allied with Germany. In April 1943, Italian police arrested Caskie in Grenoble. The Germans later ordered that all British-born civilians in the occupied countries be interned in Germany; Caskie managed to influence an Italian commandant to release many of them. Caskie was arrested again and spent some time in Italian custody at Sanremo, held in the old fortress prison. Later in 1943 he was transferred to German custody, put on trial in Fresnes prison near Paris, and sentenced to death. Awaiting execution by firing squad, Caskie asked to see a pastor. This saved his life; the German army padre Hans Helmut Peters successfully appealed to Berlin to spare Caskie. He then spent the rest of the war in a prisoner of war camp, resuming his ministry in Paris after the war.

=== Scots Kirk ===
After the war, Caskie resumed his ministry at The Scots Kirk in Paris, Lack of maintenance led to the church having to be rebuilt during the 1950s. To help pay for the rebuilding, his autobiographical account of his wartime activities was published as The Tartan Pimpernel in 1957. The 1950s building proved to have serious defects and had to be again rebuilt in the late 1990s, Caskie's book being again reissued.

=== Later life ===
Caskie was the subject of This Is Your Life in September 1959 when he was surprised by Eamonn Andrews in the foyer of the BBC Television Theatre.

Caskie returned to live in Scotland in the 1960s and became minister in Old Gourock Church. In 1967 he became a minister at Wemyss Bay and Skelmorlie on the Firth of Clyde and at St. Cuthbert's Church, Old Monkton, Ayrshire.

He retired to Edinburgh near the end of his life and, depressed and in ill health, lived in the Royal Scots Club. He had to vacate the room and move to an inexpensive bed and breakfast whenever a member of the club wished to use the room. In the final year of his life he lived with his younger brother in Greenock. He died in 1983 and is buried at Bowmore on Islay. Various personal artefacts, including his wartime medals, can be seen at Kilarrow Parish Church, Bowmore.

== Honours and awards ==
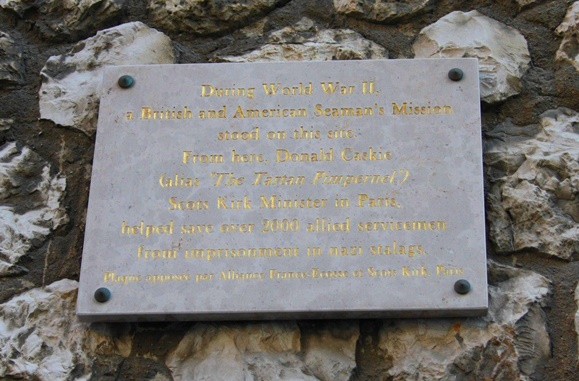
Memorial Plaque in honour of Donald Caskie as seen in 2013 at the rue de Forbin in Marseille, France

He was appointed an Officer of the Order of the British Empire (OBE) in June 1945 for services to the Forces in France.

He was honoured by the French government for his wartime service. The Alliance France-Ecosse society erected a memorial plaque at the rue de Forbin in Marseille, France.

On 26 October 2019 a memorial plaque marking his work was unveiled at the Fort de la Revere near Nice by the Le Devoir du Memoire organisation, which honours those affected by the war, including Resistance fighters.

== In popular culture ==
In 2018, a play based on Caskie's book was written by Graeme Dallas and John Hughes.

== Publications ==
- Caskie, Donald (1957). The Tartan Pimpernel. London: Oldbourne Press. OCLC 1614029.
