= Jacqueline Stieger =

British artist and sculptor

Jacqueline A. N. Stieger (born 1936) is a British artist and sculptor who primarily works in cast metal, creating jewellery and medals as well as larger sculptures. She has executed architectural commissions for churches and chapels in the UK, France and Switzerland (some jointly with her husband, Alfred Gruber, who died in 1972). She is also known for her medals, both innovative art medals and conventional commemorative examples.

== Biography ==
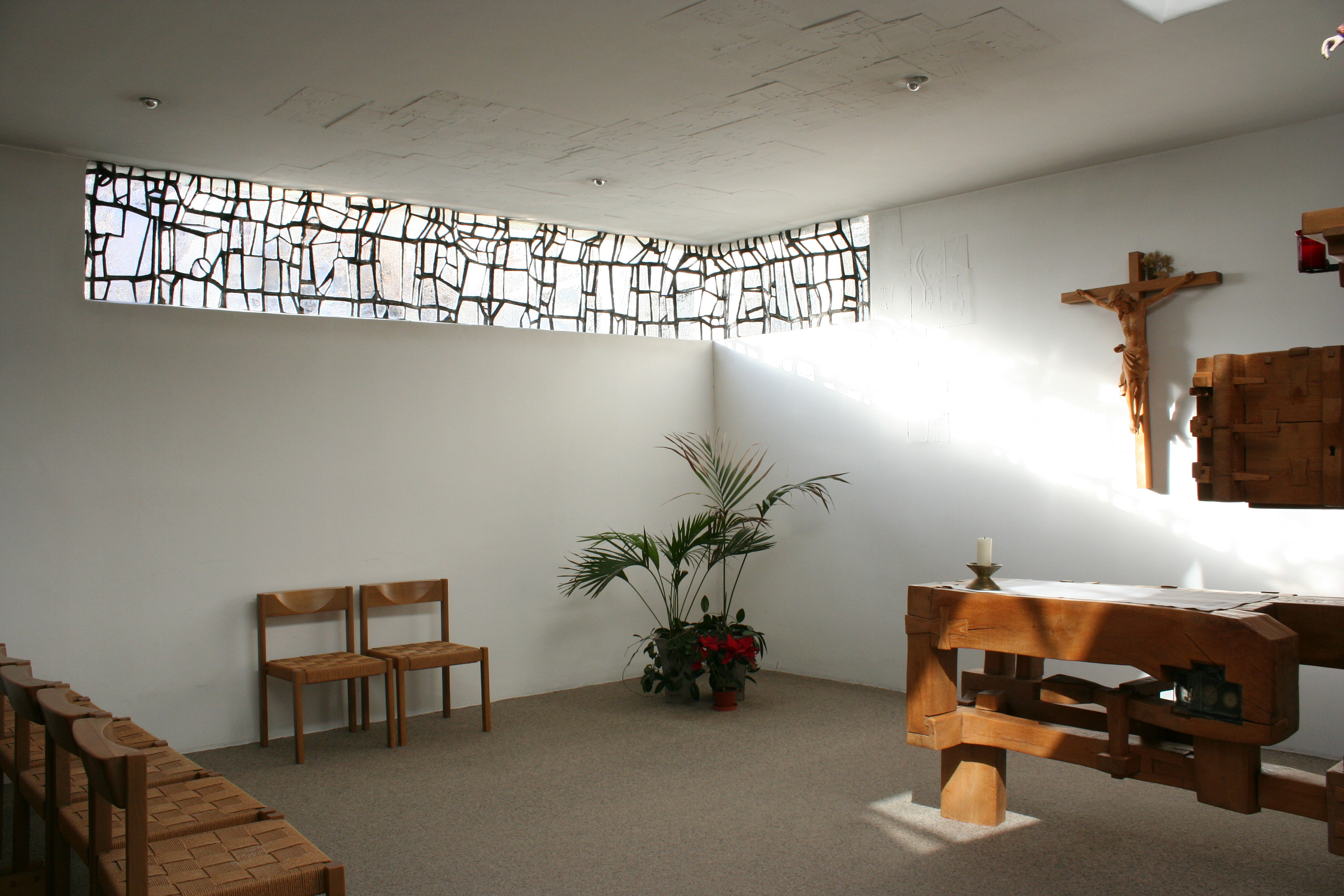
Window at the Institute St Joseph, Ilanz, Switzerland (1969)

Stieger was born in 1936 in Wimbledon, London, where her Swiss parents, Trudy and Helmuth John ("Mudi") Stieger, were attending university. Her father was an aeronautical engineer who invented the monospar wing. She had a sister, Marion. The family soon moved to the East Riding of Yorkshire, where her father headed R&D at Blackburn Aircraft in Brough. He later became vice-chair of Northern Dairies.

She was educated at the Bedales boarding school, near Petersfield, Hampshire, and later the Quaker school, The Mount School, York. She studied art at Edinburgh College of Art (1954–59), where her tutors included William Gillies, John Maxwell, William MacTaggart and James Cumming. Despite the conventional trend to the teaching at Edinburgh, she became interested in abstract art, including its application to textiles. Her first sculpture was Descent of the Cross (c. 1959), a Biblically inspired work in carved pine.

She remained in Edinburgh until 1962, when she visited Switzerland and met Alfred Gruber, an Austrian-born sculptor with a workshop in Laufen, near Basel. Gruber had started to cast and work metal, and taught Steiger some of the basic techniques. The two began a fruitful collaboration, with Stieger splitting her time between Switzerland and her studio in Beverley, Yorkshire. At her first solo exhibition in Hull the following year, the art critic Herbert Read describes her paintings as displaying "great technical accomplishment" and characterises her larger paintings as attempts at a "symbolic interpretation of natural effects"; her sculpture drew particular praise: "She creates forms of great complexity, which... I think are dynamic forms... creating a pattern of unity and significance." In 1965, she held a solo exhibition at Basel's Galerie Riehentor.

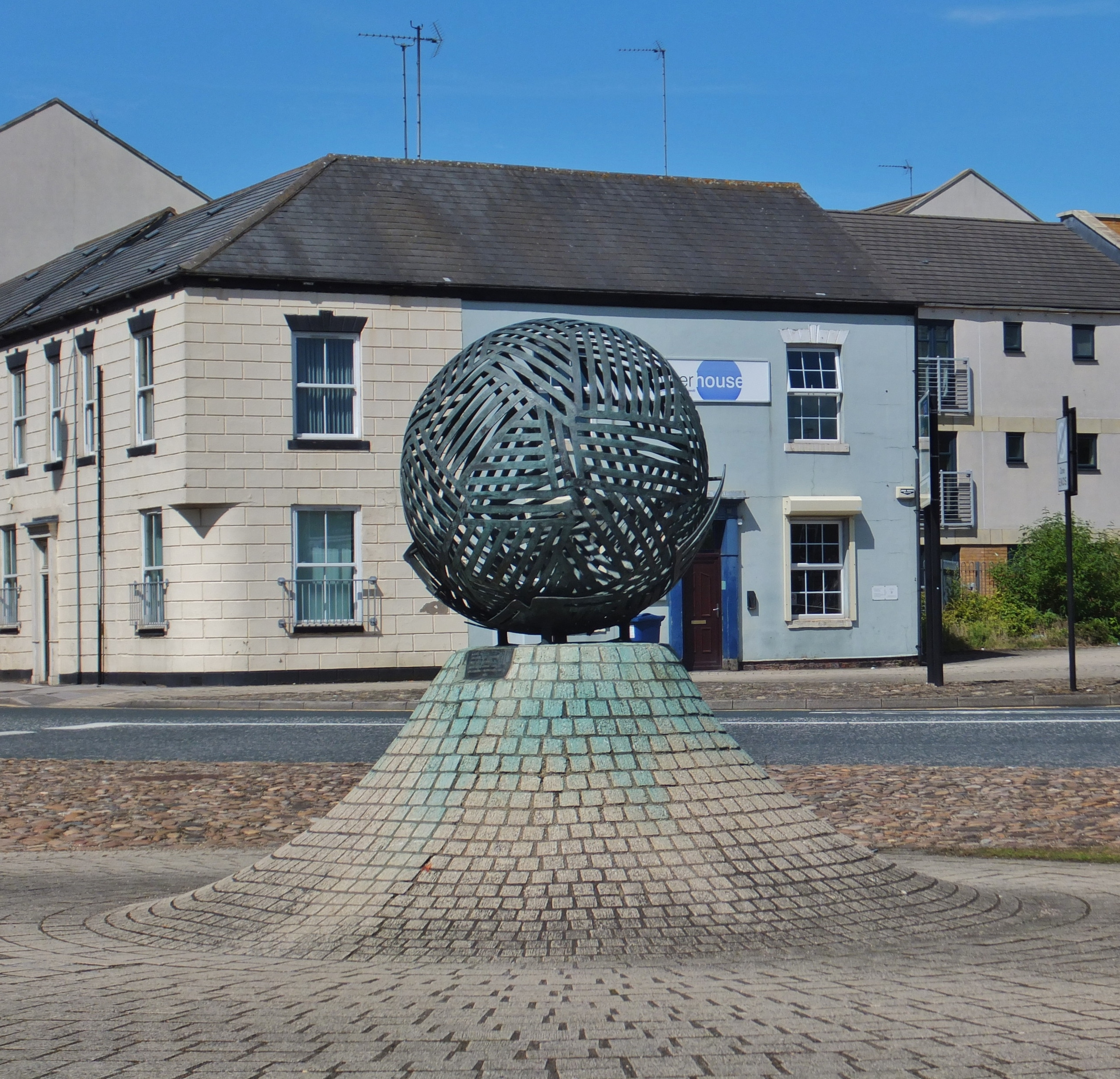
The Orb, Hull (1987)

In 1966, she and Gruber married; he had three children from an earlier marriage. The family were at first based in Switzerland, where much of their output was for church interiors, including Rudolfstetten and Sarnen, with Stieger's main contributions being windows. In 1969 they established a joint workshop and foundry in the Yorkshire village of Welton. In addition to sculptures, in Welton the couple began to create jewellery together, which they termed "microsculpture"; the graphic artist William MacKay describes it as "surely the world's most distinctive and differentiated jewellery". Pieces were purchased for Goldsmiths' Hall in London.

Gruber died of lung cancer early in 1972. Stieger kept working at Welton, participating in a joint exhibition in Leeds shortly after her husband's death, and fulfilling a major commission for Gillespie, Kidd & Coia that he had won to furnish the interior of St Margaret's Roman Catholic Church in Clydebank, Glasgow. She continued to make jewellery, which became a major output during the 1970s, and branched into creating art medals in 1973. She taught art part-time at the University of Hull's School of Architecture (1976–88). During the 1980s, she received several commissions for large-scale works, and had two solo exhibitions at the Copernican Connection Gallery in Beverley (1985, 1988), showing many large bronzes as well as jewellery and medals.

More recently, Stieger participated in an exhibition of jewellery at Goole Museum in 2021, as part of which she mentored two younger local jewellers in her techniques.

== Works ==
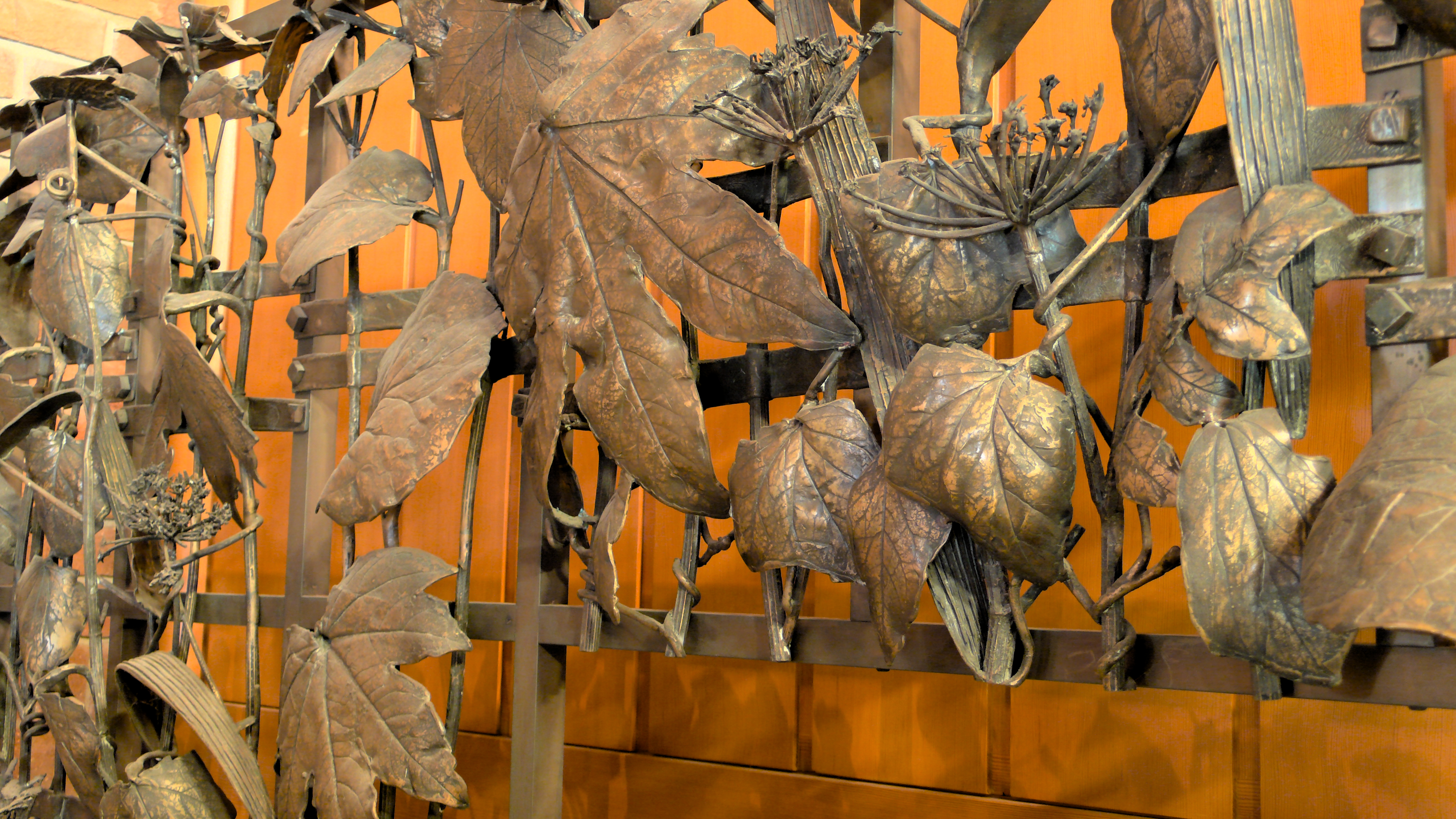
Detail of interior screen, Robinson College chapel (1980)

Stieger's works include sculptures, both architectural commissions and standalone pieces, as well as jewellery and medals, with examples in the permanent collections of the British Museum, Goldsmiths' Hall, Leeds Art Gallery, Ferens Art Gallery in Hull and the Beverley Art Gallery. Four of her works in oils as a student, three nudes and a self-portrait dating from 1958–59, are in the collection of the Edinburgh College of Art. In later works, she uses the lost-wax technique to make large and small metalworks, often using bronze, silver or gold. Her large-scale works for churches include:

- Church Ennetbaden, Zürich, Switzerland: four windows (1967)
- St Margaret's Roman Catholic Church, Clydebank, Glasgow: interior furnishings and statue of Madonna in glass/lead (1972–73); the church is now listed at grade B
- St Columbkille's Church, Rutherglen, Glasgow: shrine to St Ogilvie (1977); the church is now listed at grade A
- Robinson College chapel, Cambridge: bronze-work decoration to the west and south doors, internal bronze screen and gate (1980). The bronze screen and gate is 16 feet high, with a lattice covered with leaves and flowers, cast using the lost-wax method from plants gathered by Stieger. The chapel is now listed at grade II*
- St Giles' Cathedral, Edinburgh: bronze/stone moveable lectern steps (1991)
- St Martin in the Bull Ring, Birmingham: bronze font (2000)
- The Scots Kirk, Paris: external screen with Pictish cross (2002)
- Chingford church, east London: bronze candle votive, based on cow parsley

She has also created public artworks in England, including a bronze fountain for a Dr Barnardos centre in Ilford (1975), a bronze work outside the Old Fire Station in Beverley (1986), The Orb by the North Orbital Road in Hull (1987), The Jesters, a bronze sculpture with water at Eastgate, Beverley (1989), and a fountain at Hunmanby in North Yorkshire. In an interview, she describes The Orb as "a huge, eye-level punctuation mark which takes your eye away from its surroundings", adding that the intention is that viewers can both see into the globe and look through it.

=== Medals, small sculptures and other items ===
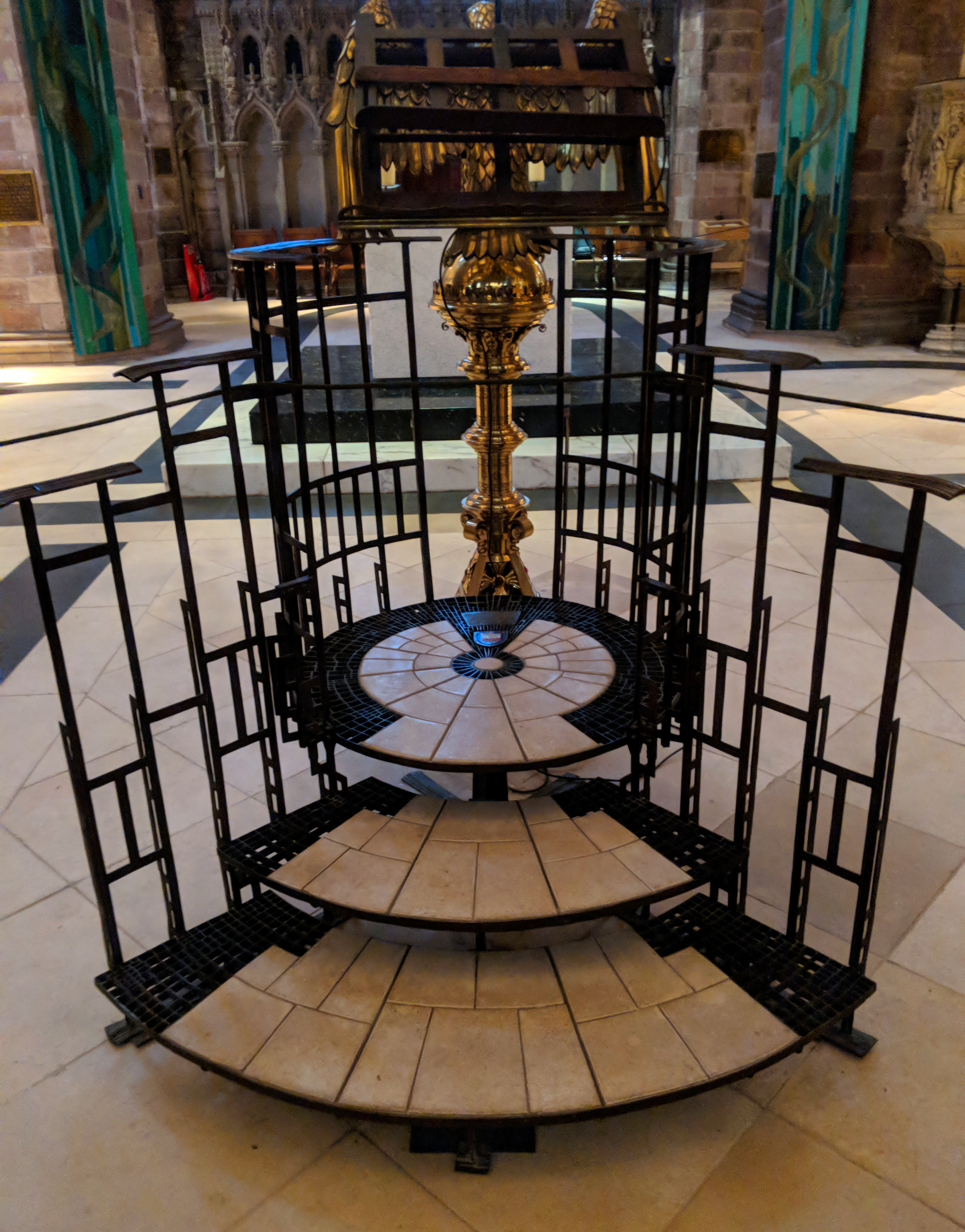
Lectern steps, St Giles' Cathedral (1991)

In an interview in 1994, Stieger said: "Medals encompass an enormous area... they can be abstract or they can say something. It's a very exacting brief ... it's about a piece to touch and turn over but at the same time it doesn't have to have a message." Her earliest medals, News and Fishes, were designed and made for the Royal Mint's "Medals Today" exhibition at Goldsmiths' Hall in 1973; both address the theme of threats to the environment, with Fishes drawing from the miracle of the loaves and fishes. Her Grow Food medal (1974), which won the Fondation pour le Développement de l'Art Médaille en France's Prix renouveau de la médaille, has an irregular outline containing shapes based on pea pods; The Telegraph's art critic Terence Mullaly describes it as a "virile abstract design suggestive of organic growth". Some of her later medals continue to address the theme of food shortage, including Food Furrows (1982), the Hunger Medal (1994) and Water Medal (2009). Stieger has also created medals on the themes of urban development, road building and traffic, including Places for People (c. 1975), influenced by the aerial and prospect architectural views in Bernard Rudofsky's book Architecture Without Architects, as well as Traffic Protest (1974) and Destruction of the Town (1992), inspired by Philip Larkin's poem, "Going, going".

Some of her medals take unusual forms. Mullaly writes in 1982 that, with British medallists Malcolm Appleby and Ronald Searle, she has "enlarged the scope of the medal." Her McKechnie Lecture Medal (1983) has a book-like form with a hinge; Mullaly considers the medal to give a "new perspective ... to the art of the medal", describing one of its faces as "intriguing and splendidly tactile." Her successful T. E. Lawrence Centenary Medal (1988) is another example of the book presentation. Her work Dr Donald MacKay, honouring the tropical health specialist, places a conventional medal inside a larger piece with a globe that splits open. In 2009, she made the medal Global Warming for Goldsmiths' Hall, which is in silver with an interior visible through a hole.

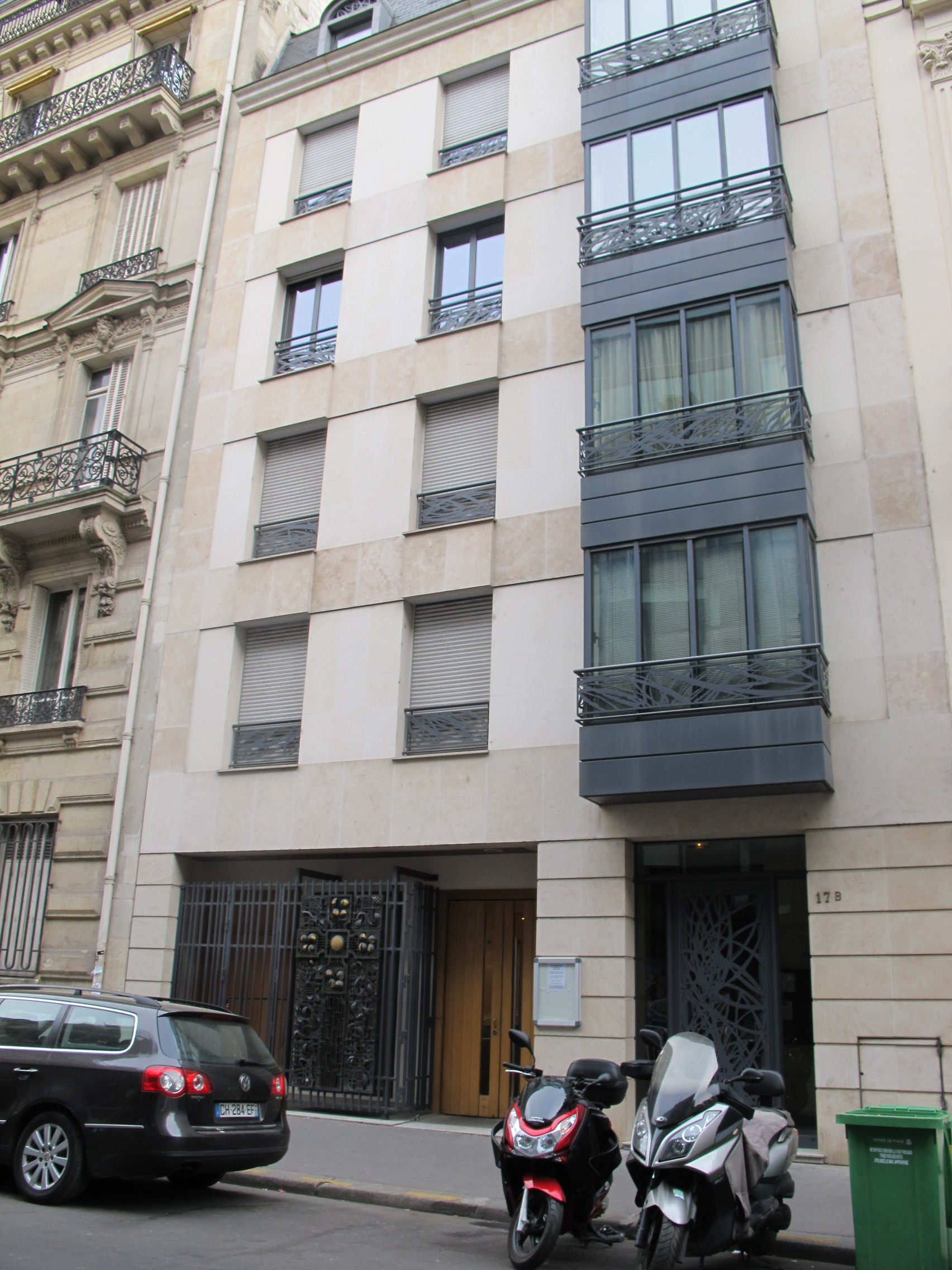
Screen at The Scots Kirk, Paris (2002)

Hinges are a feature of some of Stieger's sculptures including Spider House in bronze, lead and stone (late 1960s), which allows the viewer to interact with the sculpture. In the 1970s she created book-like bronzes with moveable leaves. Several of her sculptures depict underlying aspects of natural objects, including the bronze Homage to Hoskins (1975) – inspired by W. G. Hoskins' book, The Making of the English Landscape – which Malcolm Cook describes as "turning back layers of earth to reveal the past". Hoskins Sketch: an Aerial View (2016), with several sections of silver set with semi-precious stones and connected by hinges, continues her exploration of this idea.

She also creates conventional commemorative medals; for example, Mullaly writes that the "art of the commemorative medal is... very much alive" in her Democracy (1992), which marked two and a half millennia of the system. Her commemorative medal for the British Association for the Advancement of Science (1981) has a "wonderfully tactile" abstract reverse face with "bubbles" that "float over the edge"; Mullaly later places it "among the finest medals of recent years". She created the William Kent Tercentenary Medal (1985) and the BBC Africa Sports Star of the Year Medal (1992), and also in the 1980s had commemorative medal commissions from the Arms and Armour Society, and the Humberside College of Education's School of Architecture. Her design for a medal to commemorate the Millennium Dome won a UK-wide competition in 1999.

She designed the 1974 trophy for the Benson and Hedges Gold Cup, a horse race held at York Racecourse, creating a pair of goblets in gold with inset gemstones rather than the traditional cup; Steiger says that the designs were intended to evoke "the king and queen of a chess set". In 1976–77, she designed and made the chain of office for the chair of Humberside County Council, setting beach flint pebbles in gold.

== Awards and honours ==
Stieger received an award from the Royal Scottish Academy in 1959. She won the Prix renouveau de la médaille of the Fondation pour le Développement de l'Art Médaille en France with her 1974 medal, Grow Food. She is a freeman of the Worshipful Company of Goldsmiths (1985) and a fellow of the Royal Society of the Arts (1986).
