= St Andrew's Church, Brussels =

Church in Ixelles, Belgium

Coordinates: 50.82196°N 4.366419°E

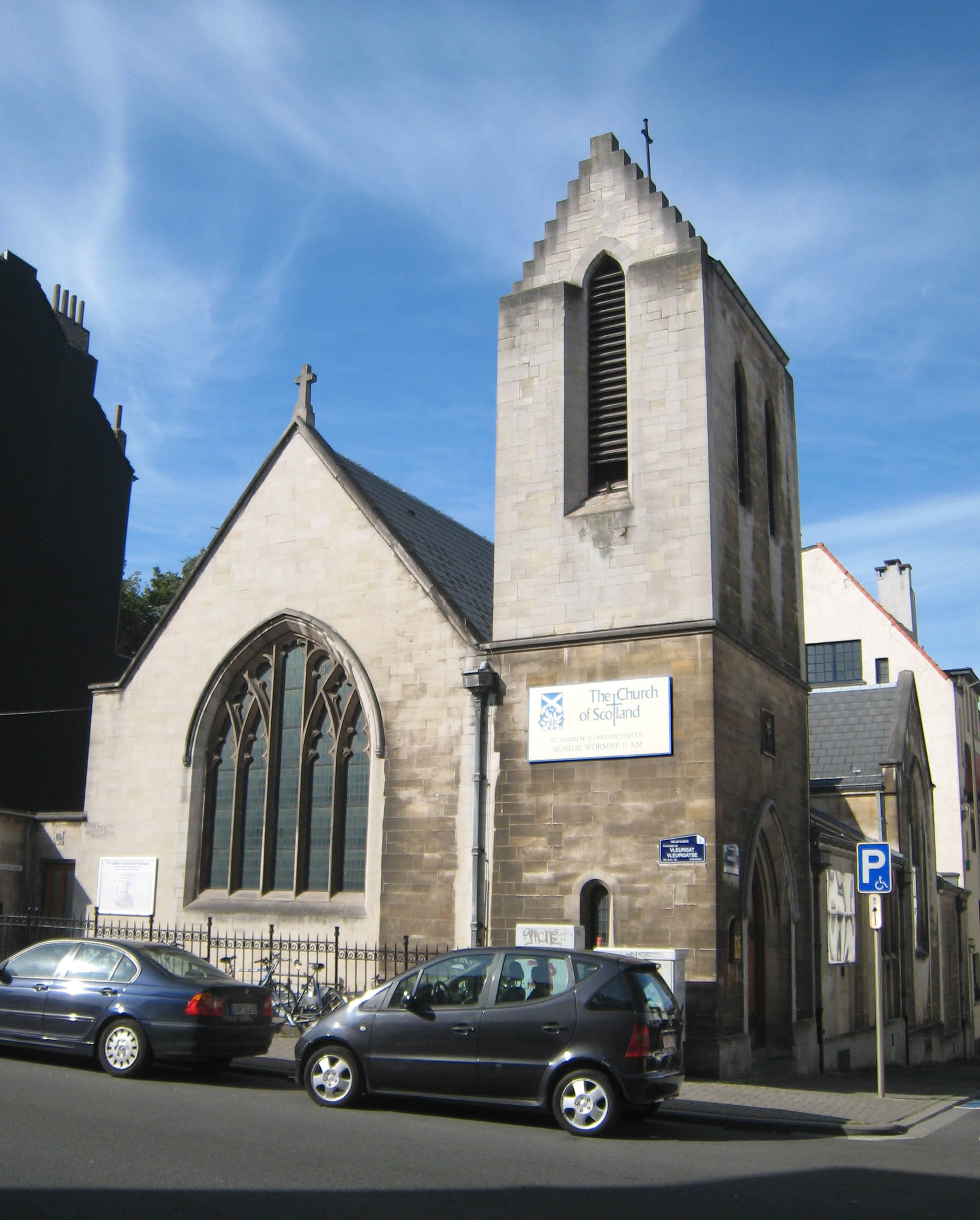
St Andrew's Church

St Andrew's Church in Brussels (Ixelles) is a congregation in membership of both the Church of Scotland and the United Protestant Church in Belgium (EPUB/VPKB) (in French Église Protestante Unie de Belgique and Dutch Verenigde Protestantse Kerk in België.) Services are conducted in English.

In 1830, a Presbyterian Scots Kirk was founded in Belgium and the Reverend Charles Siveright was the first minister. However, after the Belgian Revolution, there are no further written records of this church. In 1898, The Reverend Francis Gordon was sent to Belgium and conducted Presbyterian church services in various locations in Brussels. This arrangement with services in different places continued for 27 years. The Reverend George R.S. Reid took over from Gordon as minister in 1899 and 150 people attended a Congregational meeting that year. In 1900, the first Elders were ordained. the Kirk Session set up and a special fund was created to raise money for building a church. In 1900 the Brussels congregation was included in the Church of Scotland Presbytery of Edinburgh. As of 2016, it is part of the Church of Scotland's International Presbytery (formerly known as the Presbytery of Europe).

The present church buildings (located on the corner of Chaussée de Vleurgat or Vleurgatsesteenweg and Rue Buchholtz, Ixelles, off Louise Avenue) were built in 1925 as a memorial to the Scottish soldiers who had died in Belgium during World War I and can seat 200. The area surrounding the church is notable for its distinctive early 20th-century Art Nouveau houses, notably the nearby home of the architect Victor Horta.

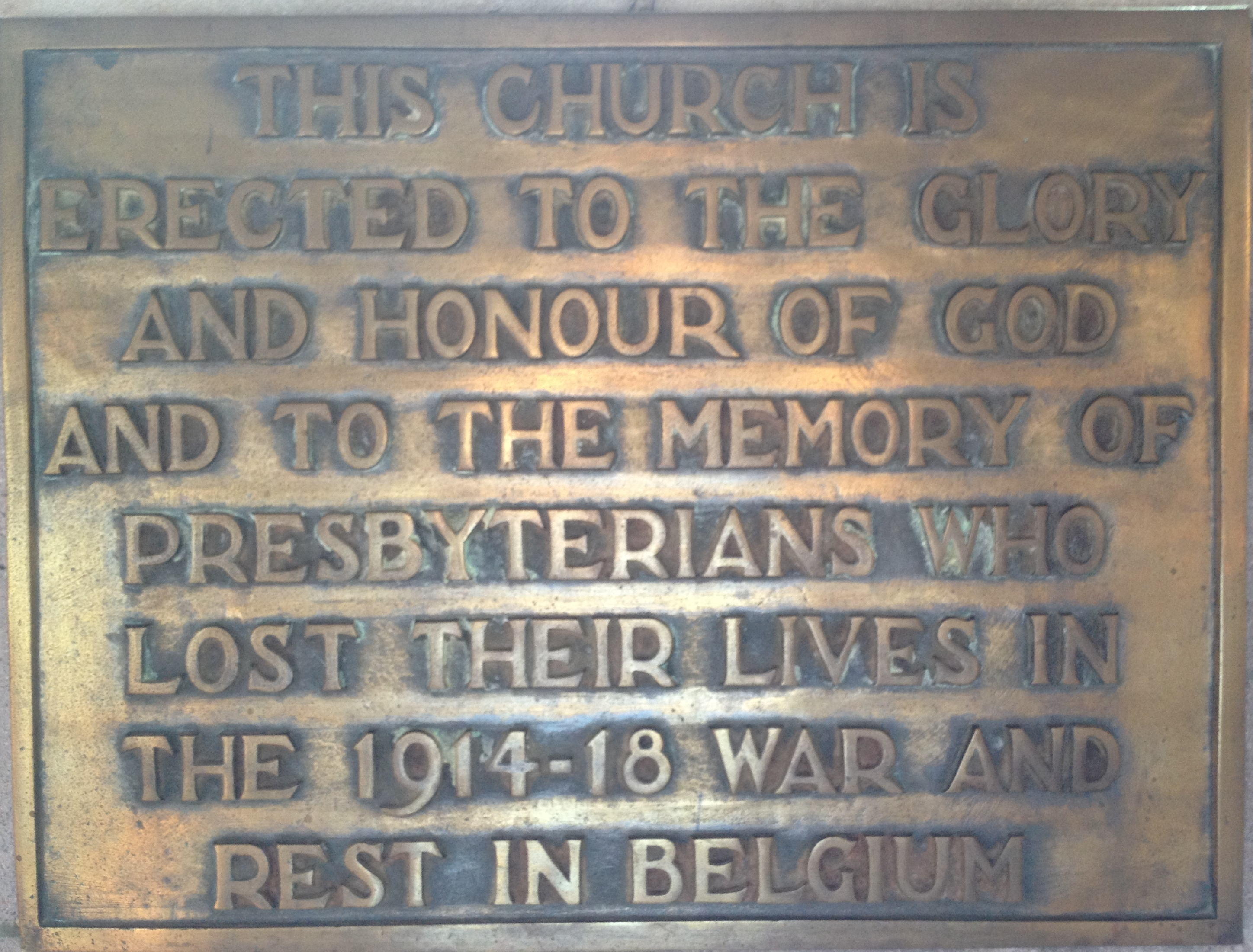
Plaque in the church describing how it was built to commemorate the 1st World War dead.

The once small congregation has grown considerably in recent years, especially as a result of the UK’s accession to (what was then known as) the Common Market in 1973 and the location of numerous international organisations in Brussels, including the European Union and NATO. The congregation in 2013 was very multinational, with more than 30 different nationalities represented. The largest numbers of people came from the UK and Ghana.

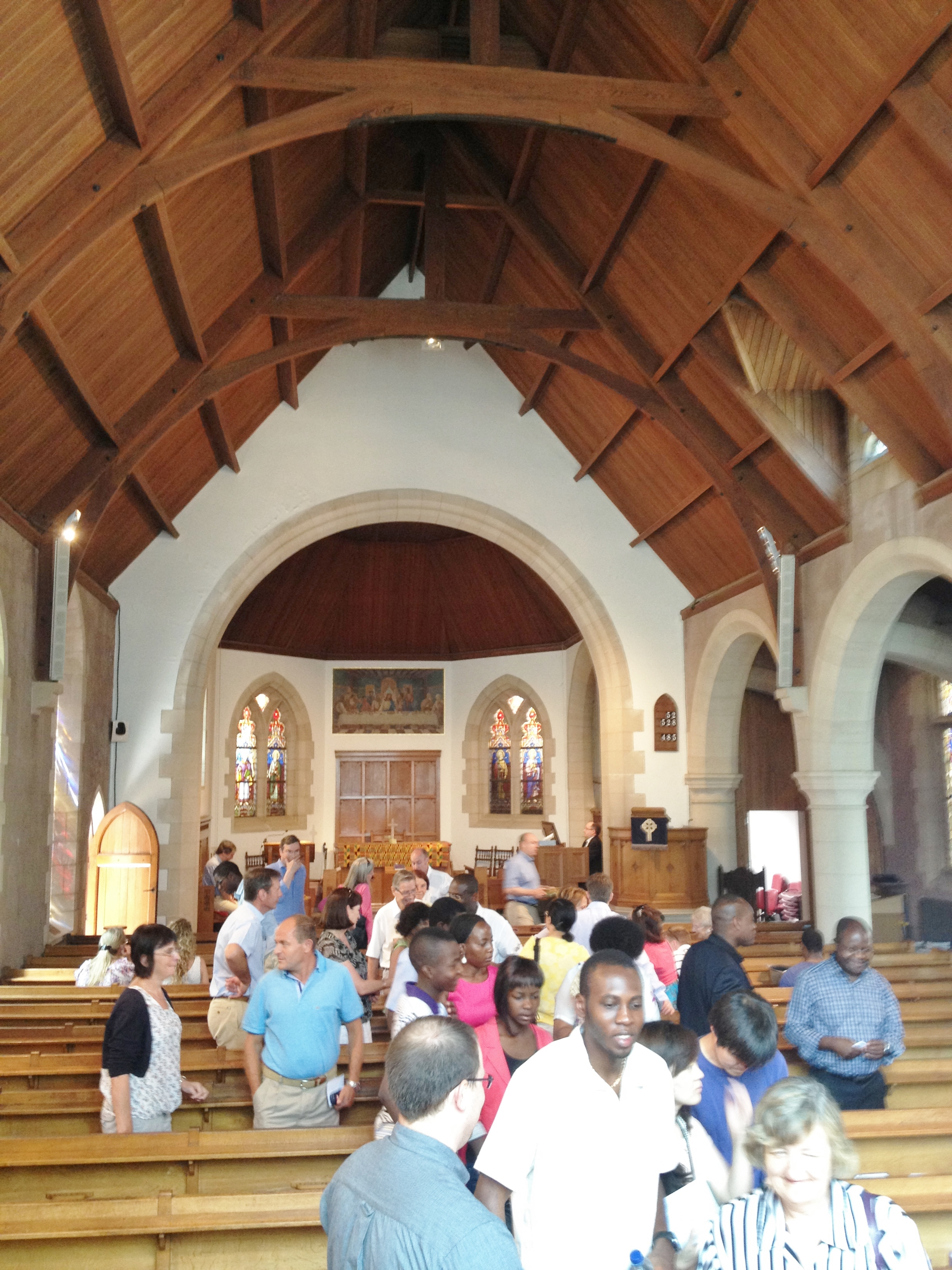
Church interior

As of 2014, the minister (since 2004) is the Reverend Dr Andrew Gardner BSc PhD BD, formerly of Flowerhill Parish Church, Airdrie, Lanarkshire, Scotland.

== See also ==
- International Presbytery (Church of Scotland)
- List of Church of Scotland parishes
- List of churches in Brussels
- Conference of European Churches
