= Scots Kirk, Lausanne =

Coordinates: 46.51670°N 6.64044°E

Scots Kirk Lausanne
- Scottish Church Lausanne
- Église écossaise de Lausanne
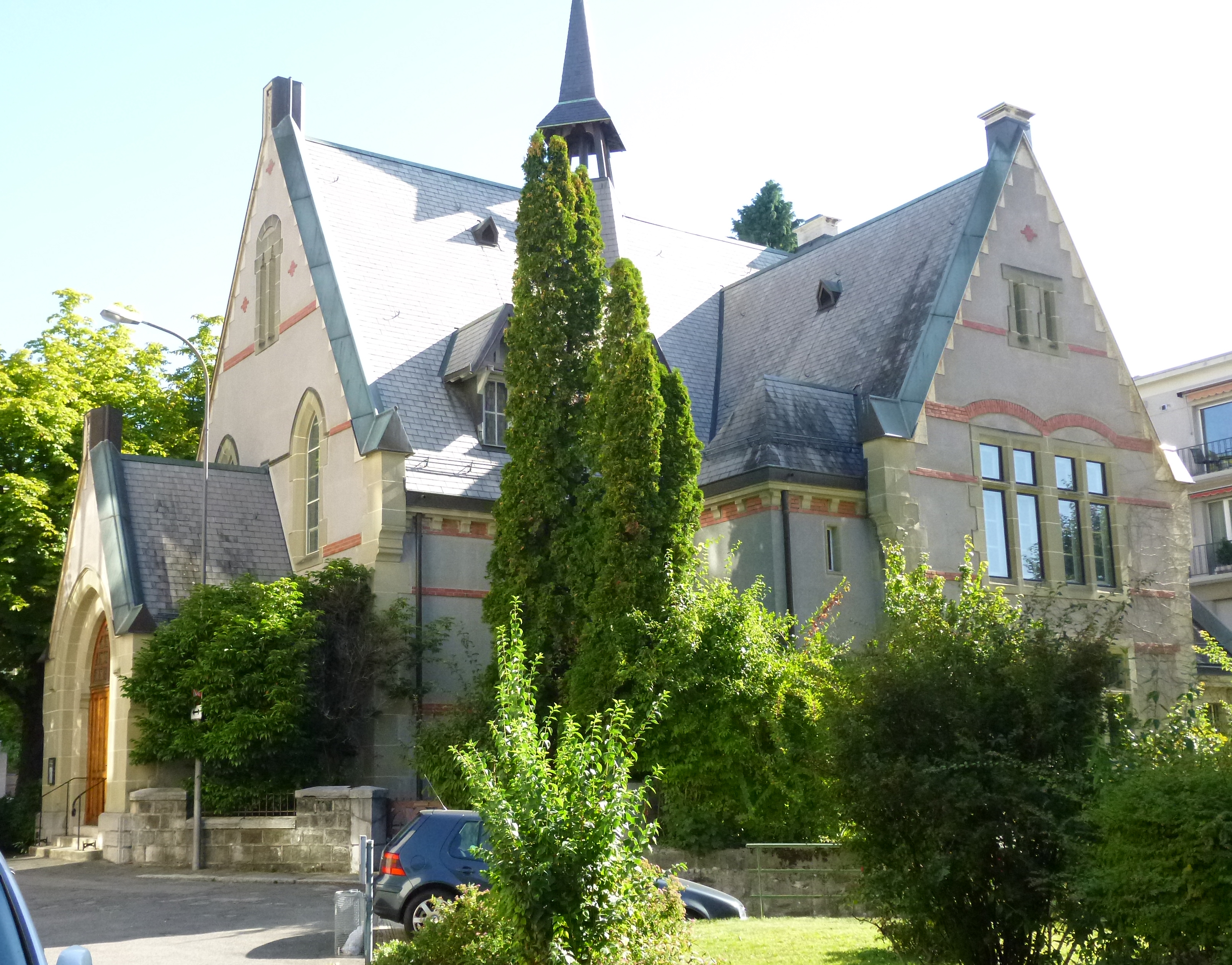
- The Scots Kirk, seen from the south-west, 2013
- Scots Kirk Lausanne
- Location: Lausanne
- Country: Switzerland
- Denomination: Presbyterian
- Website: https://www.scotskirklausanne.ch

History
- Founded: 1876
- Founder: Rev. Amalric-Frédéric Buscarlet
- Dedication: St Andrew

Architecture
- Architect(s): E.-E. Viollet-le-Duc, Jules Verrey
- Style: Neogothic
- Years built: 1876-1877

The Scots Kirk, Lausanne, is a Protestant, presbyterian church situated in Lausanne, avenue de Rumine 24. It is part of the Church of Scotland's International Presbytery and one of two congregations of the Church of Scotland in Switzerland, the other being the Scots Kirk in Geneva. Sunday services are in English.

== History ==
In Lausanne, the very first attempts to form a Presbyterian congregation go back to 1866, but they failed after two years. Amalric-Frédéric Buscarlet, pastor in Naples, was staying temporarily in Montreux, where he worked as a chaplain during the tourist season. In 1874, Mrs. Williamina Davidson invited him to come to Lausanne, to take some weekday services. Accepting the offer, he rapidly built up a small congregation, which soon asked the Continental Committee of the Free Church of Scotland to finance a permanent clerical post. Buscarlet was named the first minister of the Scottish Church in Lausanne in 1876.

The first services were held in the Musée industriel, rue Chaucrau, or in the chapel of the Église libre des Terreaux, but swiftly Buscarlet gathered the necessary funds for the construction of a dedicated building. He engaged one of the most celebrated French architects of the period, Eugène-Emmanuel Viollet-le-Duc (who was then working on the restoration of Lausanne Cathedral), to draw up plans for a new church. The construction was entrusted to Jules Verrey, a local architect who constructed a number of other religious buildings, particularly for the Free Church of Vaud. The new church was formally dedicated to the glory of God on April 12, 1877, although it had still not been completely finished. The Rev. Buscarlet remained in post until 1907.

Constructed between 1876 and 1877, the church was completed in 1879 by the addition of a small vestry on the south-eastern side of the building. Originally known as Trinity Presbyterian Church, it was renamed St Andrew’s Church, probably in 1933 following a property transfer from the United Free Church of Scotland to the Church of Scotland. The church was restored in 1953 and again in 1981–1982, then under the direction of Marcel D. Mueller, an architect of Belgian origin, and a member of the congregation.

The building is of interest for its asymmetric architectural shape and its finely crafted timbered roof, both inspired by rural English and Scottish churches. In addition, its interior layout and furnishings are original: the pews, the raised central pulpit (reached by two converging staircases), the Communion table and the celebrants’ seats were realised according to the designs of Viollet-le-Duc.

In 1974, the building was registered in the Heritage Inventory (recensement architectural du Canton de Vaud), and in 1995 it was made a category B listed building under federal protection (Protection des Biens Culturels en cas de conflit armé).

Stained glass windows. East wall: 1971, by Bernard Viglino, Chavornay. North wall: 1981, by Jean Prahin, Rivaz.

Organ: 1974, built by E. Armagni and J.-F. Mingot, Lausanne. The instrument was paid for by a member of the congregation, Ian Reddihough, who also designed and stitched the four large tapestries (1967-1975) adorning the walls of the church.

St Andrew’s House, the church hall, was built between 1958 and 1962 after the plans of the architect Mueller.

=== Ministers of the Scots Kirk Lausanne ===
- 1874-1910 Amalric-Frédéric Buscarlet, in Naples, from 1907 in Pau, remained honorary minister in Lausanne until 1910
- 1907-1919 Alexander-M. Sutherland, from Leith
- 1919-1923 Hector Adam, chaplain in Montreux from 1908
- 1923-1927 Norman Nicholson, from Castle Douglas
- 1928-1937 John E. Oldham, from the parish of Eaglesham, near Glasgow
- 1937-1947 Donald Campbell, formerly in Buenos Aires and Cannes
- 1947-1959 Kenneth Tyson, Army chaplain during WW II, then pastor in Leicester
- 1959-1968 Andrew Wylie, Royal Navy chaplain, then in Glasgow
- 1968-1974 Ian W. Malcolm, pastor in the Middle East during WW II, then in Lanarkshire and Edinburgh
- 1974-1980 Maurice Isherwood, naval officer, banker, later pastor in Cyprus
- 1980-1985 Hugh Kerr, formerly minister in Tiberias, Israel
- 1985-1994 Murray Stewart, YMCA Europe
- 1994-2004 Douglas Murray, formerly minister in the parishes of Glasgow, Leith, and Wishaw
- 2004-2008 Melvyn Wood, formerly in Cullen and Deskford
- 2008-2010 Interregnum
- 2010-? Ian McDonald, formerly hospital chaplain in Kirkcaldy
- 2019-2023 Gillean P. MacLean, formerly minister on the Isle of Arran
- 2023- Served by locum ministers pending appointment of a new permanent minister

== Linkage with Geneva ==
From 2025, the Scots Kirk in Lausanne will be "linked" with the Church of Scotland, Geneva - i.e. both congregations sharing a minister, but retaining separate administration as one is in the Canton of Vaud and the other in the Canton of Geneva.

== See also ==
- Scottish Church in Rotterdam
- The Scots Kirk, Paris

== Sources ==
- Jacques Gubler, "Viollet-le-Duc et l'architecture rurale", in Viollet-le-Duc. Centenaire de la mort à Lausanne (Exhibition in the Musée historique de l'Ancien-Evêché), Lausanne 1979.
- [Hugh Kerr], The Scots Kirk Lausanne, A short History, Lausanne 1984 (new edition nov. 2013).
