= International Presbytery =

The International Presbytery (officially, the Presbytery of International Charges) covers the Church of Scotland's congregations in continental Europe, Sri Lanka and the Caribbean. Until 2016 it was called the Presbytery of Europe. In October 2014 it was agreed to move towards changing the name to the International Presbytery.

As a Presbyterian church, the Church of Scotland has no bishops. Instead courts of ministers, elders and deacons have collective responsibility for the governance of the church. The Presbytery is the intermediate court of the church, subject to the General Assembly and responsible for the oversight of Kirk Sessions (at a congregational level.)

The International Presbytery is one of three presbyteries operating outside Scotland (the other two being the Presbytery of England and the Presbytery of Jerusalem.) The Presbytery of Europe was created in 1974 through the union of the former Presbyteries of North Europe, South Europe and Spain & Portugal, being officially renamed the Presbytery of International Charges in 2016.

Most Scottish presbyteries meet monthly. Because of geography, the International Presbytery meets in person twice per year (March and October) for a conference-style meeting, delegating interim business to its Business Committee, which meets virtually each month.

See also the Website

== Office bearers ==
As with all courts of the Church of Scotland, the Presbytery is chaired by an (annually elected) moderator. The Presbytery Clerk until 2025 was the Reverend Derek Lawson. Since early 2026, Rev Scott MacSween (OLM in Paris) has been the Clerk.

=== Recent moderators ===
- 2003-04 The Rev. Kenneth Mackenzie (Budapest)
- 2004-05 The Rev. Ian Manson (Geneva)
- 2005-06 The Rev. David Morris (Malta)
- 2006-07 The Rev. William McCulloch (Rome)
- 2007-08 The Rev. Stewart Lamont (Gibraltar)
- 2008-09 The Rev. James Sharp (Auxiliary minister, Geneva)
- 2009-10 The Rev. Matthew Ross (Conference of European Churches, Brussels)
- 2010-11 Mrs Alice Tulloch (Elder, Geneva)
- 2011-12 The Rev. James Brown (Bochum)
- 2012-13 The Rev. Rhona Dunphy (Regensburg)
- 2013-14 The Rev. Dr Andrew Gardner (Brussels)
- 2014-15 The Rev. Aaron Stevens (Budapest)
- 2015-16 Mr Alec Grant (Elder, Brussels)
- 2016-17 Mrs Rhoda Grant (Elder, Brussels)
- 2017-18 The Rev. Ewen MacLean (Gibraltar)
- 2018-19 The Rev. Derek Lawson (Rotterdam)
- 2020-21 The Rev. James Sharp (Geneva)
- 2021-22 The Rev. Irene Bom (OLM Rotterdam)
- 2022-23 The Rev. Laurence Twaddle (Geneva)
- 2023-24 The Rev. Joanne Evans- Boiten
- 2024-25 The Rev. Betsi Thane (Malta)
- 2025-26 Thijs Polstra (Amsterdam)

== Congregations ==
The Presbytery has 10 congregations in Europe, 3 outside Europe, plus associated congregations. Whilst appreciating their close links with Scotland and the Church of Scotland, all seek to provide English-language Reformed Christian worship and pastoral care to people of all nationalities. Scots are thus a minority at almost all the congregations.

The Presbytery meets at one of its congregations on a six yearly cycle. The "sanctioned charges" of the Church of Scotland in continental Europe (determined by an Act of the General Assembly) are:

- Belgium - St Andrew's Church, Brussels
- France - The Scots Kirk, Paris
- Hungary - St Columba's Church, Budapest
- Italy - St Andrew's Church, Rome
- Malta - St. Andrew's Scots Church, Valletta
- Netherlands - English Reformed Church, Amsterdam
- Netherlands - The Scots International Church, Rotterdam
- Portugal - St Andrew's Church, Lisbon
- Switzerland - Church of Scotland, Geneva
- Switzerland - The Scots Kirk, Lausanne

Most of the congregations are very long-established. Some are also joint members of the Church of Scotland and the local Reformed Church (notably in the Netherlands and Belgium.) The Scottish Reformer John Knox was minister of the Geneva congregation prior to his return to Scotland.

The Presbytery is also exploring ways of establishing links with other existing English-speaking Reformed congregations. Associated congregations have now been developed at Bochum and Regensburg in Germany, other locations are also being investigated. There is also a close link with the English-speaking congregation in Turin, which was formerly served by a Church of Scotland minister.

== Papal visit ==
Whilst meeting in Rome in 1992, the Presbytery of Europe was addressed by Pope John Paul II.

== Bermuda, Trinidad and Sri Lanka ==
In 2008, the General Assembly of the Church of Scotland agreed that the congregations of Christ Church, Warwick, Bermuda and St Andrew's Church, Colombo, Sri Lanka should become part of the Presbytery of Europe. They were previously listed as "overseas charges" under the direct supervision of the World Mission Council. In 2012, a similar decision agreed to admit the Church of Scotland, Trinidad (COST) to the Presbytery of Europe.

== Former Congregations & Mission Work ==
Former Church of Scotland congregations and mission work across the world includes:

- Germany - Dresden
- The Netherlands - Campvere, Delft, Dort, Flushing, The Hague, Leyden, Middelburg in Walcheren, Utrecht.
- Italy - Turin, Venice. Genoa
- Gibraltar
- Cyprus - Nicosia, Limasol
- Spain - Costa Del Sol
- Egypt - Alexandria, Cairo,
- Kenya- Nairobi
- Mauritius,
- Portugal - Maderia,
- Ireland (various locations)
- France - Nice,
- Austria - Vienna
- South Africa
- Myanmar - Rangoon,
- India
- China
- Australia, including Tasmania
- Fiji
- New Zealand
- Canada
- United States of America
- Antigua
- The Bahamas
- Grenada
- Jamaica
- St Vincent
- Belieze
- Guyana (British Guiana)
- Argentina
- Chile
- Peru

There has also been mission work carried out overseas under the Church of Scotland in Malawi, Zambia, Bangladesh and Pakistan, among other places.

== See also ==
- Presbytery of Aberdeen
- Presbytery of Glasgow
