= Amalric-Frédéric Buscarlet =

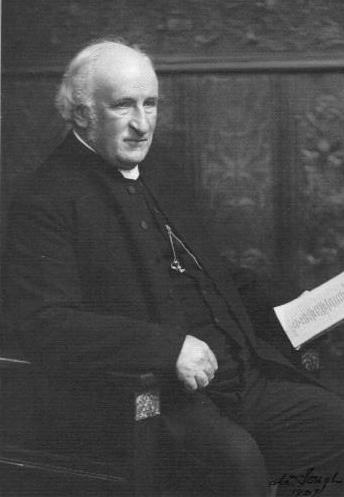
Amalric-Frédéric Buscarlet (1836–1928). Photographic portrait by Francis de Jongh in 1907

Amalric-Frédéric Buscarlet (1836 in Nice – 19 February 1928 in Pau) worked in Italy, Switzerland and France as a minister of the Church of Scotland.

== Biography ==
A branch of the Buscarlet family, originating from Millau in Rouergue Aveyron, France, settled in Geneva during the 18th century. Marc, a glovemaker, came to Geneva in about 1776 and founded the present family line.

The Reverend Amalric-Frédéric Buscarlet was son of Jules-[Léonard] (1807–1882), who in 1834 married Frances Eliza, daughter of Robert Bowen of Bristol, in Florence. Having studied theology in Geneva, Jules was ordained minister in 1833 and worked in Florence (1834), in Nice (1835) at the mission of the Genevan Evangelical Society in Pau (Basses-Pyrénées, France), then at the Free Church of Pau (1838–1849), finally in Paris (1849–1858).

It is thought that his son, Amalric-Frédéric Buscarlet, was adopted by an aunt, with whom he lived in England until the age of twelve. He then returned to France, where he completed his education in Toulouse, and then went to Edinburgh, to study in the Theology Faculty of the Free Church. After a short stay in Livorno as a suffragan minister, he was ordained as a minister in 1861 and appointed to a newly founded Scottish Church in Naples. He worked there for thirteen years, taking particular interest in educational charities and in the construction of a church, a manse and a school.

A.-F. Buscarlet also stayed temporarily in Montreux during the tourist season, acting as a chaplain in the Scottish chapel which had been newly built in 1872–1873. He was called to Lausanne in 1874, where he organised religious services for a small congregation. In 1876 he was nominated for the newly created post of minister of the Scots Kirk, Lausanne. He quickly managed to have a church built following the plans of the French architect Eugène Viollet-le-Duc. It was inaugurated in 1877.

A.-F. Buscarlet exerted a great influence on the young English speakers studying at the finishing schools of Lausanne. More than three thousand are said to have followed his Bible studies. More generally, he was much involved in promoting the Protestant cause in Europe and in evangelization in Italy; he was also a member of the Sunday Observance Society.

In 1907, he accepted the leadership of the English-speaking Church in Pau, but remained honorary minister in Lausanne until 1910. A trip to Canada in 1910 to visit his son in Manitoba gave him the opportunity of establishing contacts which, one year later, gained him a doctorate in divinity from the Presbyterian Theology College in Montreal.

A brass plaque commemorates his pastoral activities in the Scots Kirk, Lausanne (engraved in London 1931).

His wife Anna, née Willett, of Norfolk, died in Lausanne in 1905 (plaque in the Scots Kirk, Lausanne). She gave him a daughter, Florence Margaret (born in 1862 in Naples, spinster, died at Pau in 1943) and two sons, who began their education in Lausanne at the Collège Galliard in 1876–1879.

Frederick Willett, born in 1863 in Southampton, became a farmer in Souris, Manitoba, Canada, where he died in 1959. Francis Charles, born in Hethersett Norfolk in 1865, studied civil engineering at the Royal Indian Engineering College (1885–1888) and started his career in India, working for a railway company in Madras (1890–1893). He was then employed on the west coast of Canada. On his return to England, he settled first in Newcastle, then in Sunderland, working for the London and North Eastern Railway. He died in 1957 in Derry.

== Sources ==
- Archives cantonales vaudoises : Dossier ATS (Buscarlet), and Fonds PP 540, The Scots Kirk Lausanne.
- Daniel Buscarlet, De Millau à Genève : une famille du Refuge, les Buscarlet et leurs descendants, s. l., s. n., 1983, 30 p.
