= Bowmore =

Town in Islay, Scotland

Coordinates: 55.757°N 6.287°W

Bowmore: Scottish Gaelic: Bogh Mòr
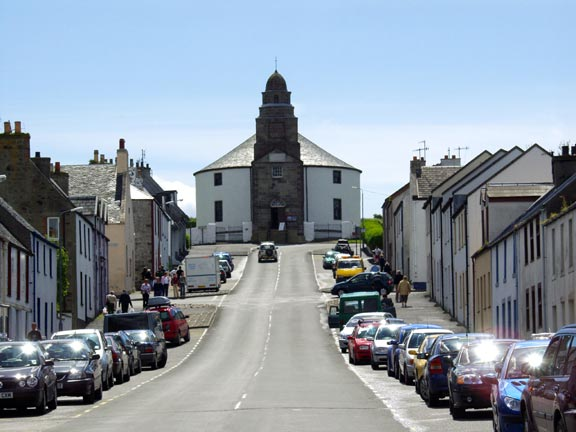
- Bowmore main street, looking towards Kilarrow Parish Church

- Location within Argyll and Bute
- Population: 710 (2020)
- OS grid reference: NR310598
  - Edinburgh: 121 mi (195 km)
  - London: 387 mi (623 km)
- Civil parish: Killarow and Kilmeny
- Council area: Argyll and Bute
- Lieutenancy area: Argyll and Bute
- Country: Scotland
- Sovereign state: United Kingdom
- Post town: ISLE OF ISLAY
- Postcode district: PA43
- Dialling code: 01496
- Police: Scotland
- Fire: Scottish
- Ambulance: Scottish
- UK Parliament: Argyll, Bute and South Lochaber
- Scottish Parliament: Argyll and Bute

Bowmore (Scottish Gaelic: Bogh Mòr, 'Big Bend') is a small town on the Scottish island of Islay, situated on the banks of the sea loch, Loch Indaal. It serves as administrative capital of the island, and gives its name to the noted Bowmore distillery producing Bowmore single malt scotch whisky.

== History ==
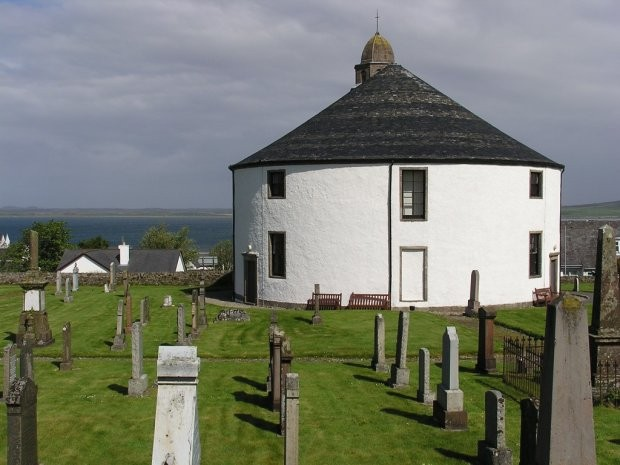
Kilarrow Parish Church in Bowmore

Bowmore is a planned village with wide streets on a grid-iron pattern. It has its origins in an earlier settlement, Kilarrow, which until c. 1770 occupied the site of the present grounds of Islay House near Bridgend.

In May 1685, Kilarrow was the scene of the first stages of Argyll's Rising, when rebels under the Earl of Argyll arrived from the Netherlands in an unsuccessful attempt to overthrow King James II and VII.

As part of his plans for improvements at Islay House, Daniel Campbell the Younger initiated the construction of the new village in 1770, just after the completion of the new Kilarrow Parish Church, which was built in a unique circular shape. The old village of Kilarrow and its church dedicated to St Maelrhuba, were then demolished, and its residents were relocated to the new village of Bowmore. Kilarrow Old Churchyard still exists close to the site of the former village.

The Bowmore distillery came into operation some time before 1816 and is situated on the shores of Loch Indaal. In the 1980s, one of the distillery's warehouses was gifted to the community for conversion to a swimming pool and leisure centre. Named the Mactaggart Centre after one of the scheme's major donors, Sir John Mactaggart, it uses an innovative system of underground pipes to transfer waste heat from the distillery to the water for the swimming pool.

=== Fishing ===
The Annual Reports of the Fishery Board for Scotland provide an insight into the state of fishing from Bowmore in the years before the First World War. In the report for 1900 we learn that that they fished in Lochindaal for cod, haddock and flounders using small lines, and also used lobster creels.

Fishery Statistics

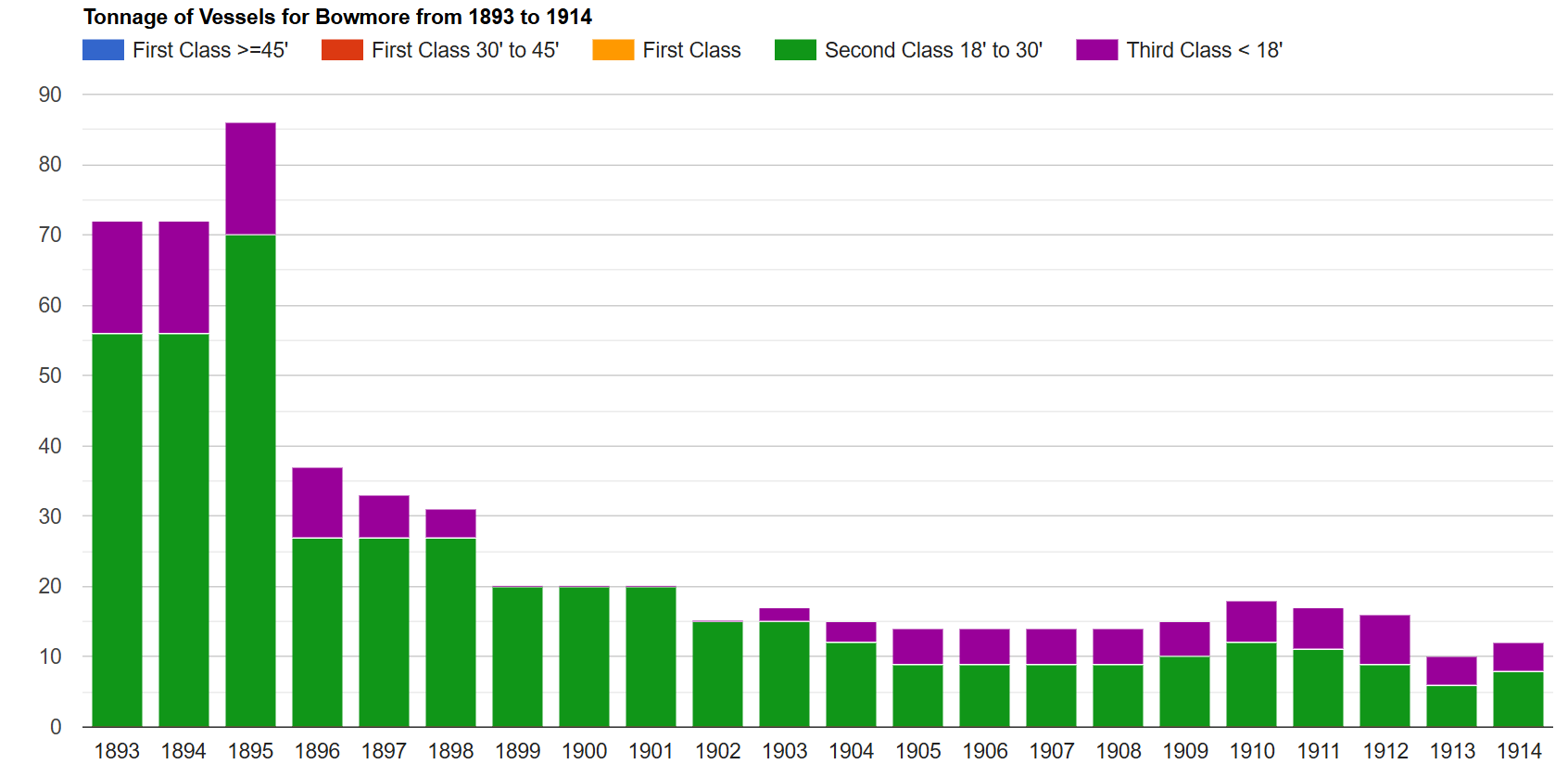
Tonnage of vessels

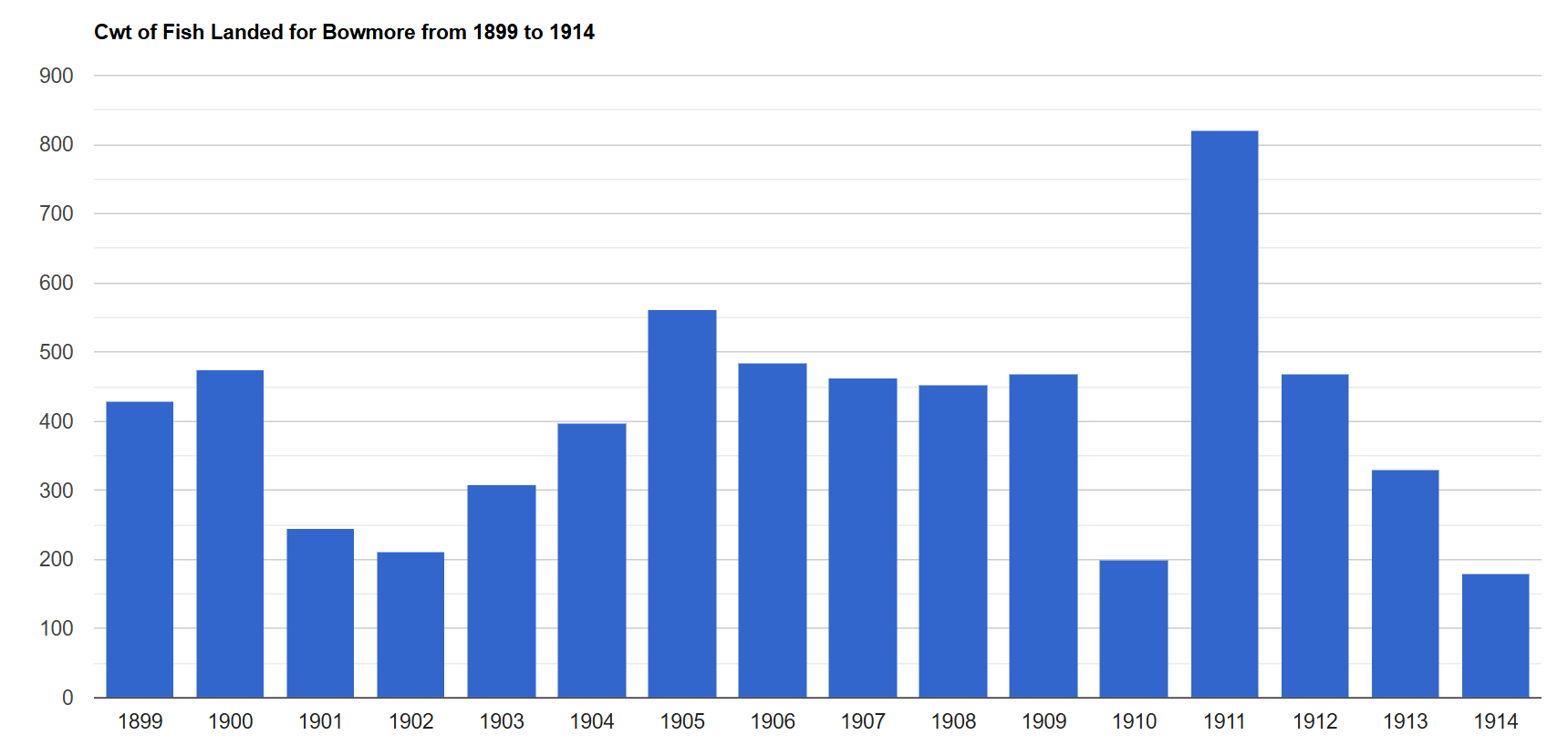
Cwt of fish landed

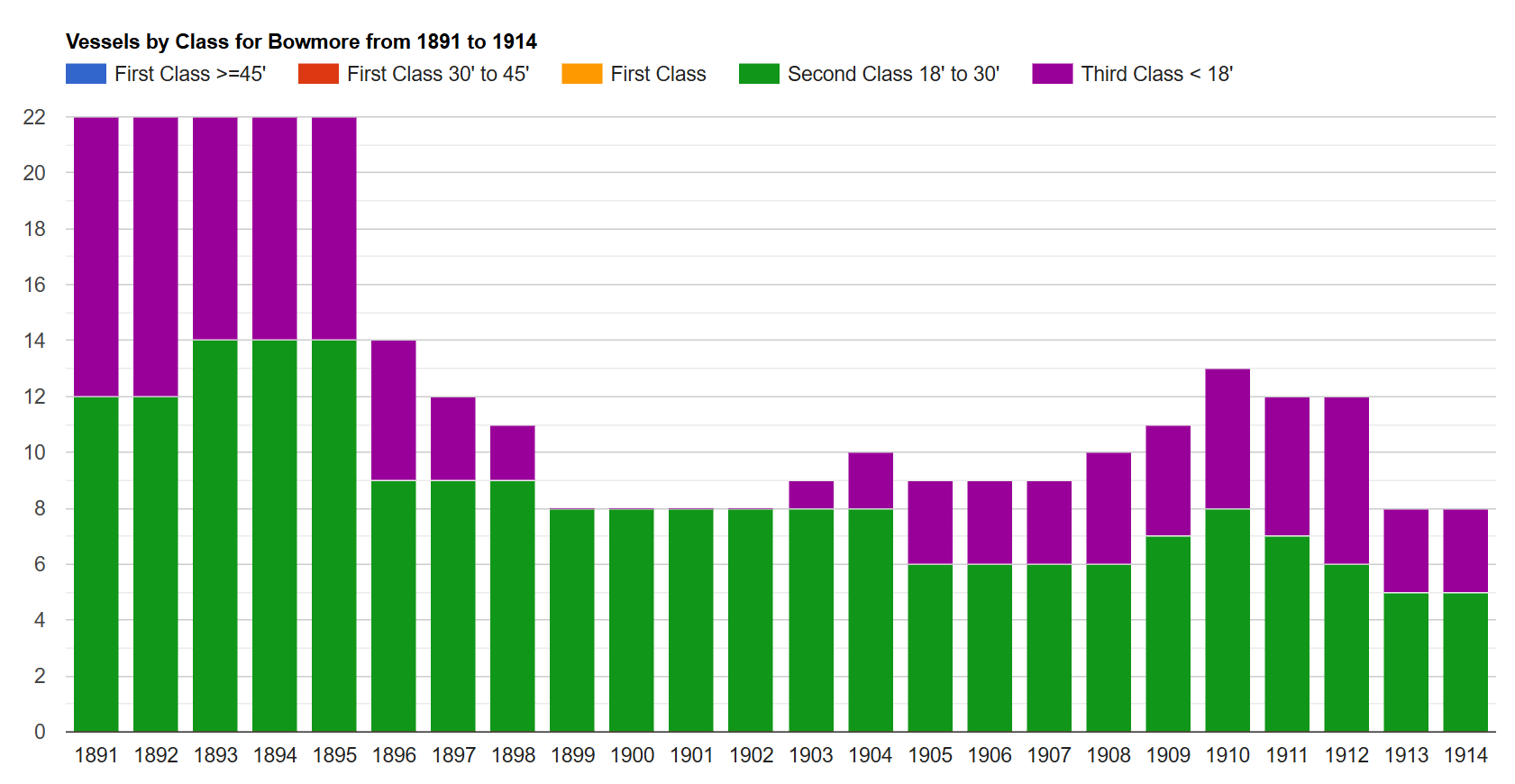
Vessels by class

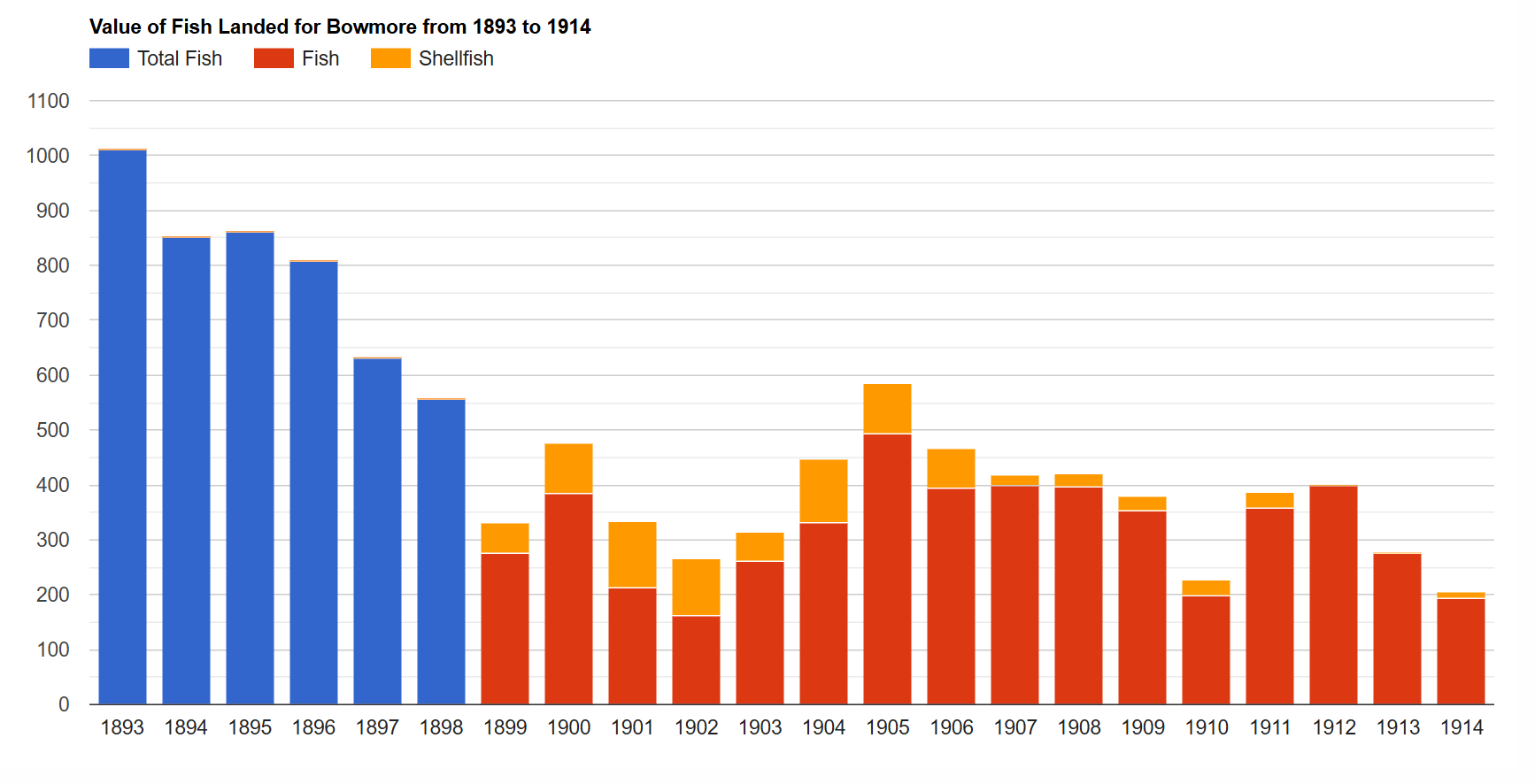
Value (£) of fish landed

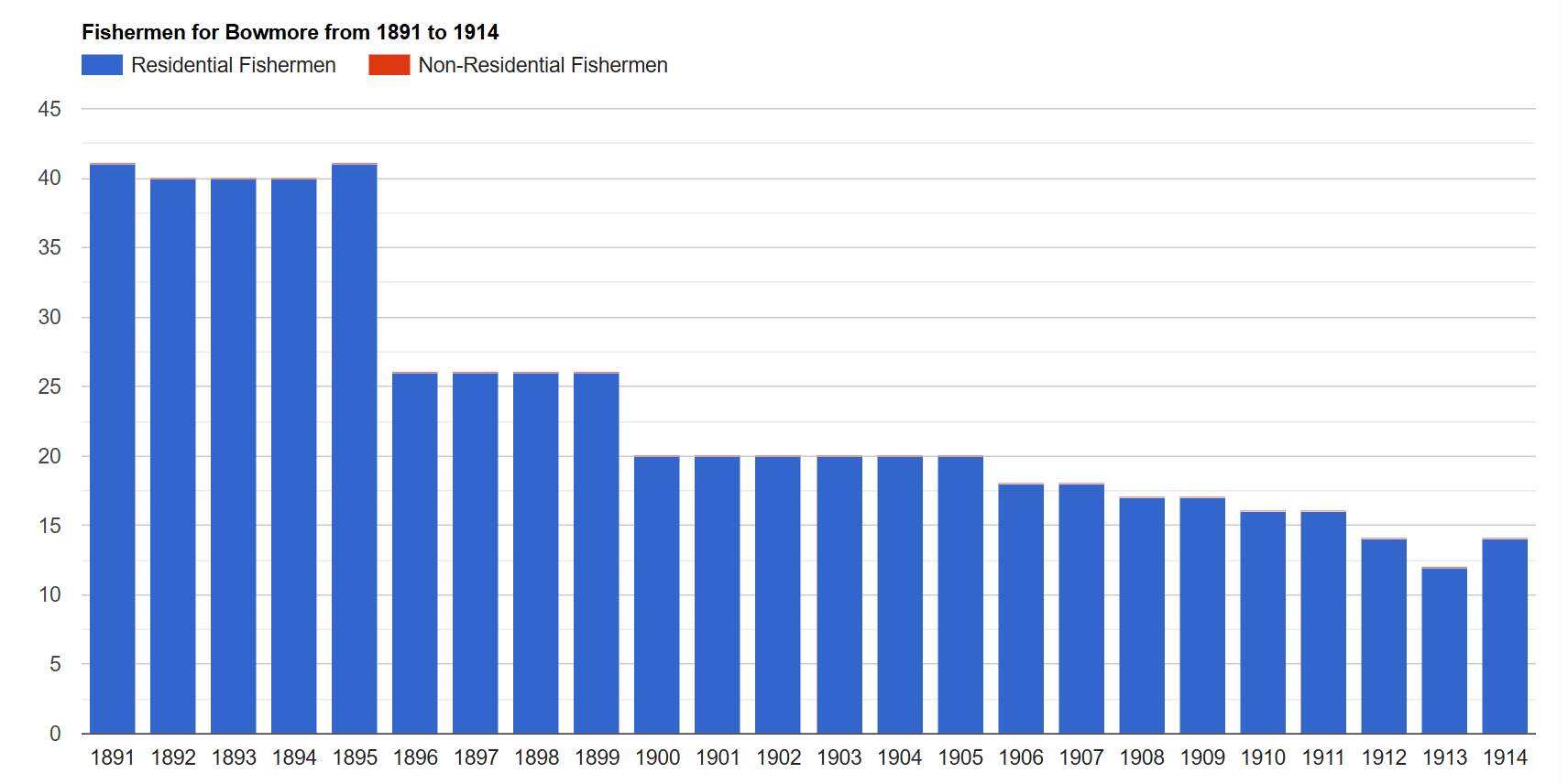
Fishermen

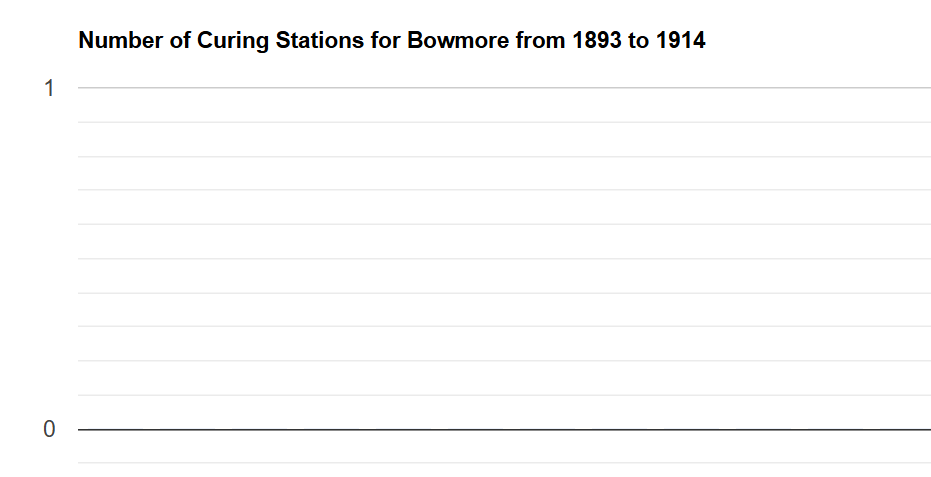
Placeholder- no curing stations

=== Bowmore in WWII ===
There was an RAF seaplane base at Bowmore during the Second World War called RAF Bowmore. Short Sunderland and Consolidated PBY Catalina flying boats operated from Loch Indaal. Some of the wartime film Coastal Command was filmed in Bowmore - fictional name RAF Ferry Bay - and it features a shot of a Sunderland flying low over the main street of Bowmore and over Kilarrow Parish Church.

The RAF built a diesel power station close to the A846 road at the eastern end of Bowmore, to supply their facilities. This was taken over by the North of Scotland Hydro-Electric Board in 1949, and was extended several times, increasing its capacity to 6 MW. However, the National Grid reached Islay in 1962, with an undersea cable connection from the mainland to Jura, and another from Jura to Islay, after which the station was only maintained as a backup. It is currently owned by Scottish and Southern Electricity.

== Facilities ==
Bowmore has several hotels, restaurants, shops, a hospital, a high school and is home to the Ìleach newspaper, community newspaper of the year 2006. Bowmore is also host to Ionad Chaluim Chille Ìle (the Columba Centre), a cultural centre and college founded with the aim of promoting Gaelic language revival and heritage on the Island.

== Noted residents ==
- William Livingstone (Scottish Gaelic: Uilleam Mac Dhunlèibhe) (1808–1870), an important figure in 19th-century Scottish Gaelic literature and chronicler of the Highland Clearances upon Islay, was born at Gartmain farm near Bowmore.
- Donald Caskie (1902-1983), noted as the "Tartan Pimpernel" for his wartime exploits in France. He was responsible for the safe passage of numerous exiles through the Scots Kirk in Paris during World War II.
- Actor Vivian MacKerrell (1944-1995), whose parents are buried at Bowmore and whose ashes were scattered on Loch Indaal.
- Glenn Campbell (b. 1976), political correspondent for BBC Scotland.

== Gallery ==
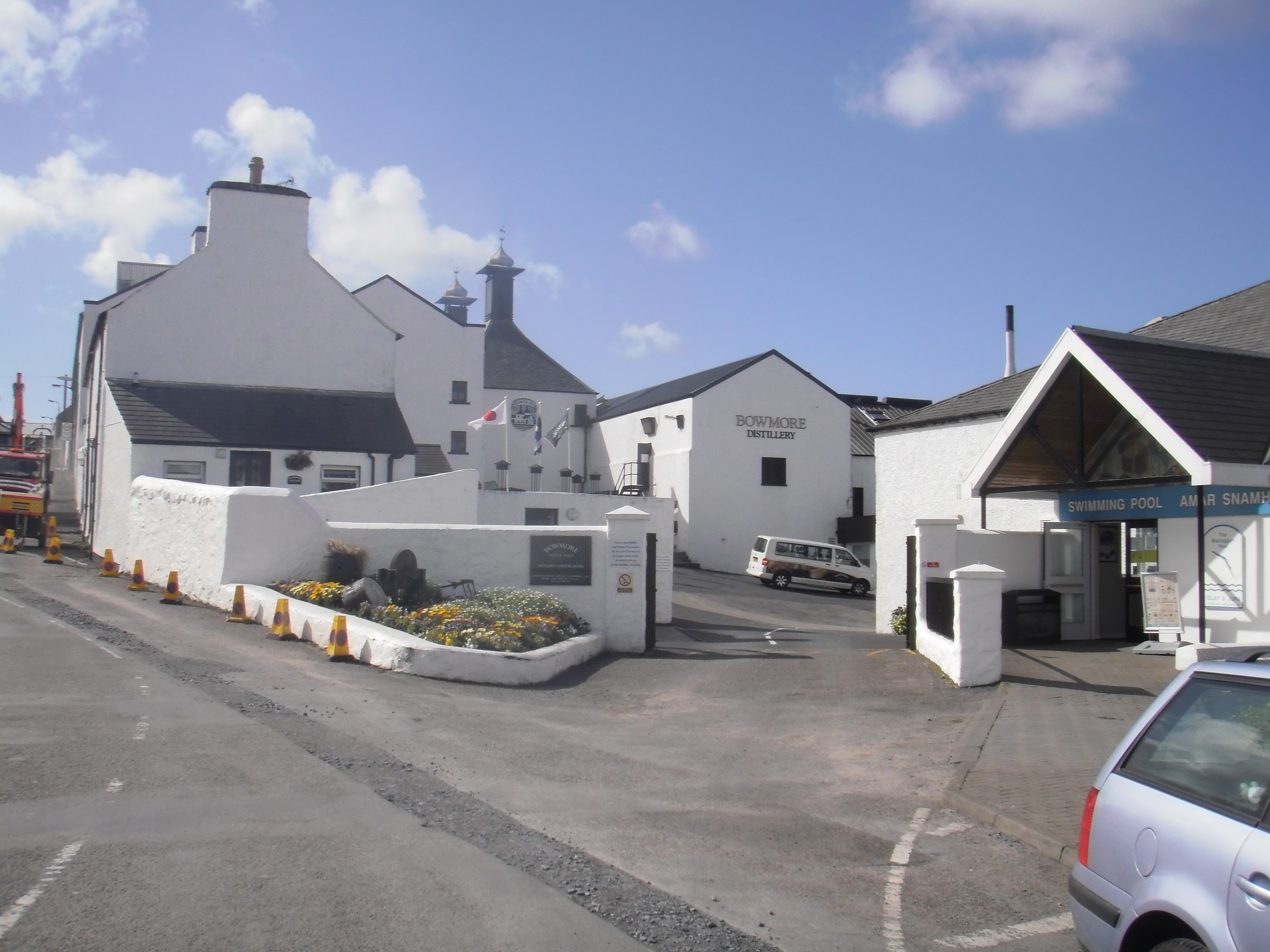
Distillery of Bowmore

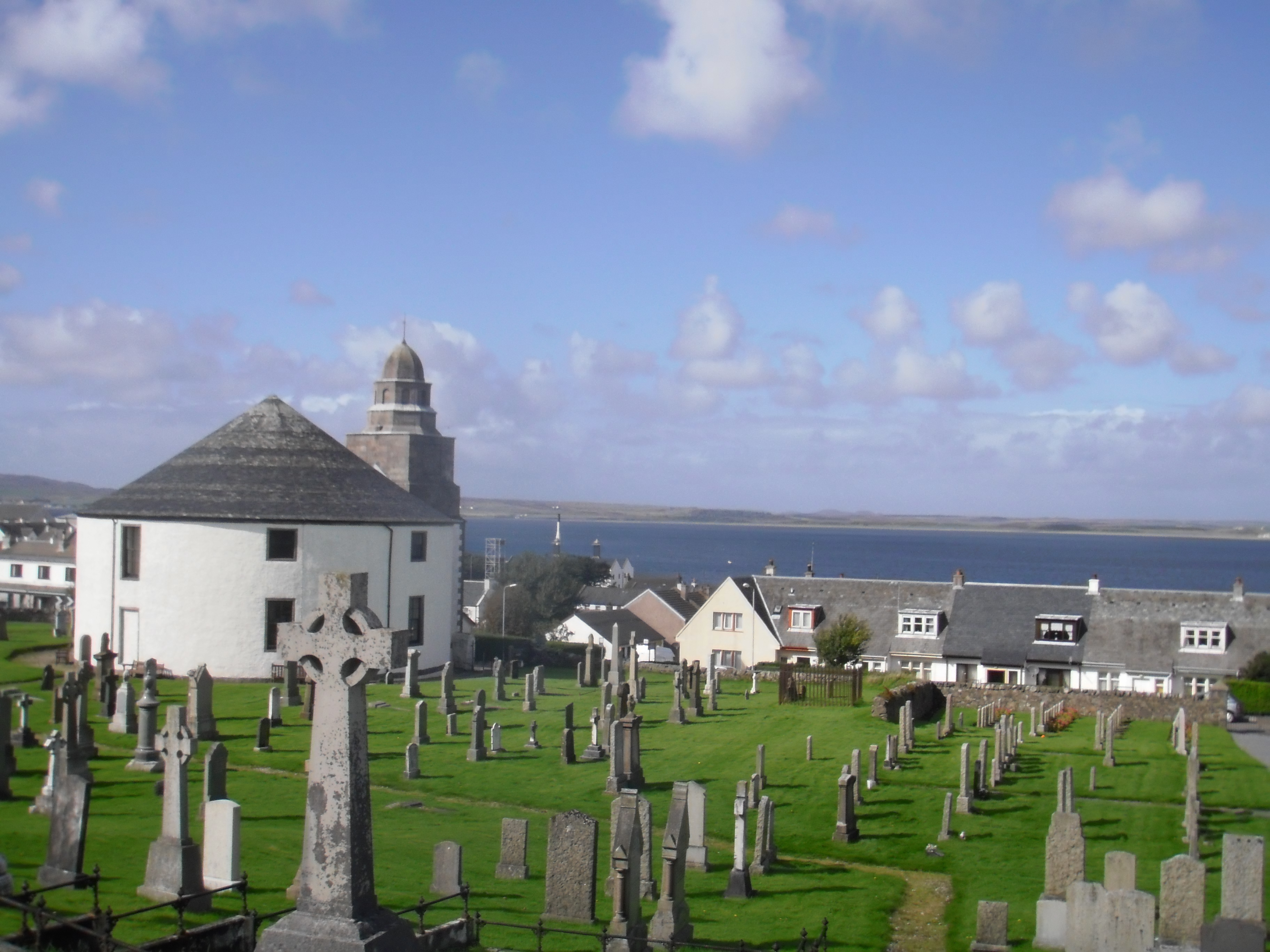
Round Church of Bowmore
