= The Scots Kirk, Paris =

The Scots Kirk Paris
- Église écossaise
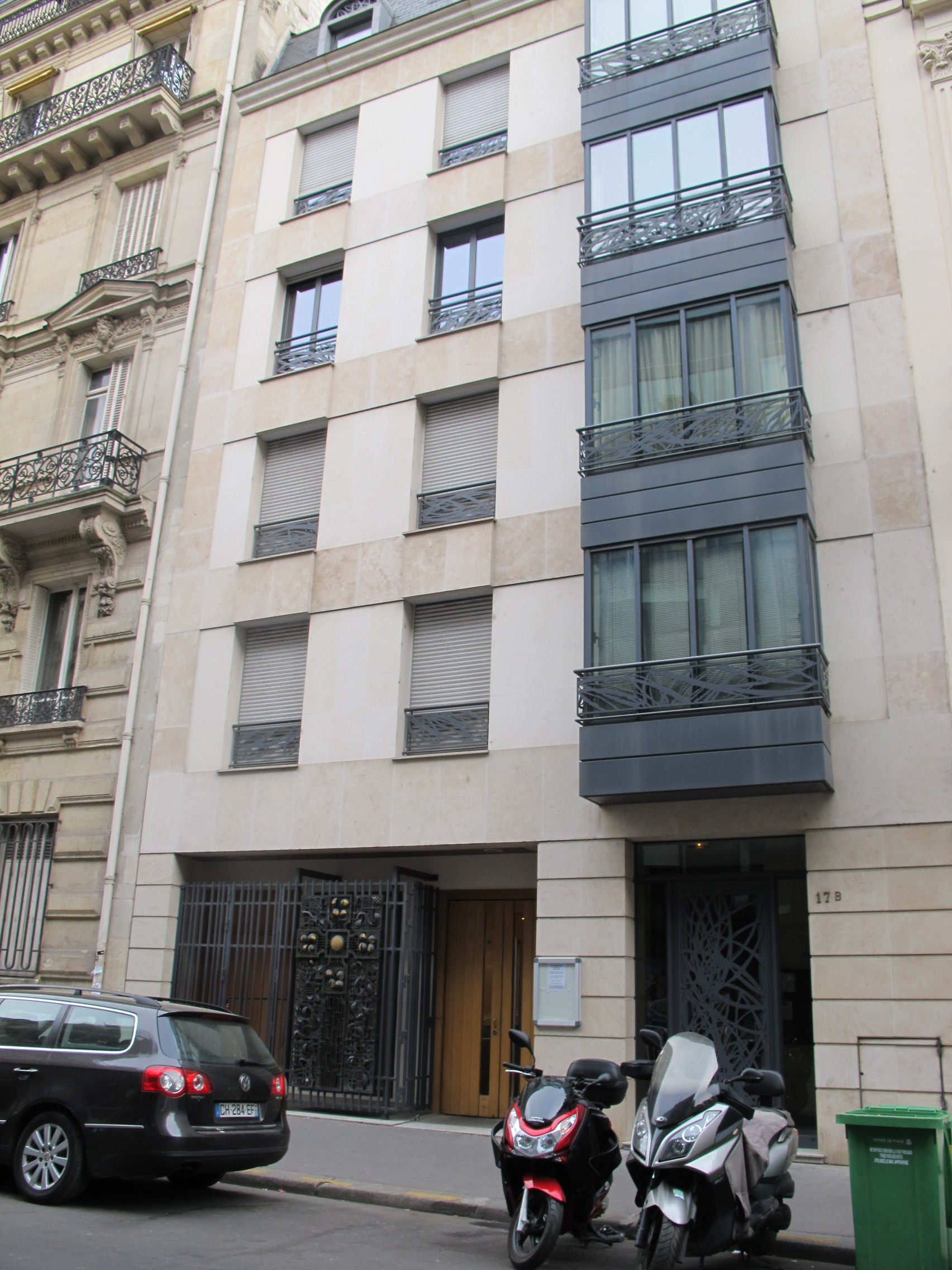

- The location of the Scots Kirk in Paris
- 48°52′0.5″N 2°18′27.5″E
- Location: Paris
- Country: France
- Denomination: Church of Scotland
- Website: www.scotskirkparis.com

History
- Founded: 1858
- Founder: Rev John Tulloch
- Events: 1885, church purchased

Architecture
- Years built: 1864 (1st building); 1957 (2nd building)
- Groundbreaking: 1999
- Completed: 2002

The Scots Kirk Paris (French: L'Église écossaise) is a Presbyterian Protestant church situated in Paris, in rue Bayard near the Champs-Elysées in the 8th arrondissement. It is the only congregation of the Church of Scotland in France, part of the International Presbytery.

The church itself is incorporated in a modern apartment building, whose construction began in 1999 and was completed in 2002. The current church is the third built on the site.

The congregation is particularly well known for their former minister Donald Caskie who wrote an account of his exploits during World War II, The Tartan Pimpernel.

== History ==
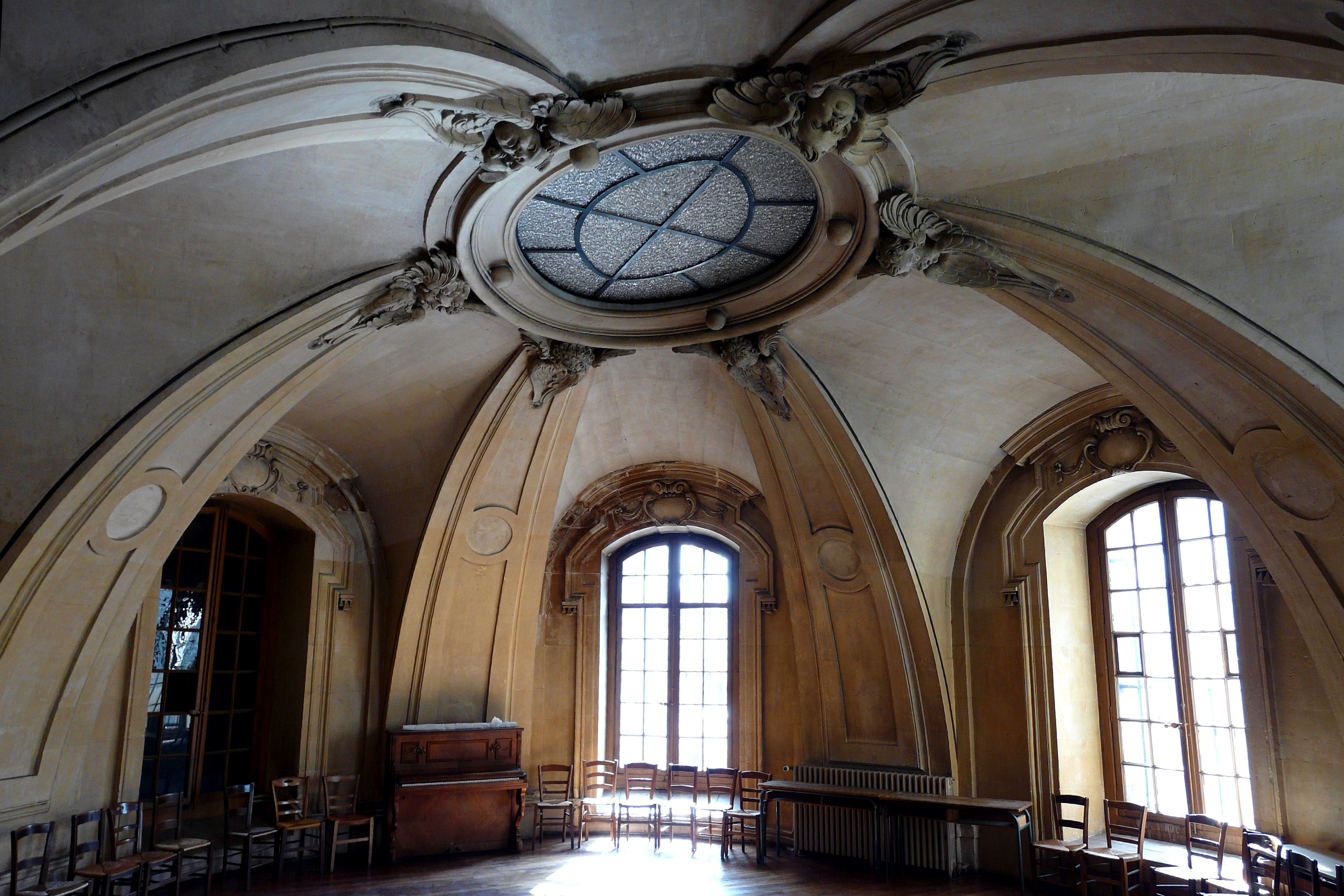
The upper room in l'Oratoire du Louvre, home to the Scots Kirk from 1858 to 1885

=== Origins ===
The congregation of the Scots Kirk Paris was founded in 1858. The origins of the congregation lie in the arrival of the Scottish theologian John Tulloch who was appointed by the Church of Scotland to establish a Scottish presbyterian church in Paris.

In its first years of existence, the congregation was welcomed within l'Oratoire du Louvre where among other recently established English-speaking protestant churches the upper room was lent to them for worship.

During the Exposition Universelle of 1867, the whole church of the Oratoire du Louvre was given to the congregation to lead a service on Sundays afternoon, due to the numerous Presbyterians visiting the city of Paris on that occasion. Collections to acquire an own building for the congregation took place during those services.

In 1880, the old church Rue Bayard owned by the American Episcopalian parish of the Holy Trinity was put on the market for sale. In 1881 the Scots Kirk Paris congregation made a first contact with them regarding the acquisition of the building. However it was two years later, in 1883, that the church was officially bought. The congregation got the possession of the building granted in 1885 and have worshiped on that site since then.

=== Three church buildings on the same site ===
The first church building had been erected by the American Episcopalian parish of the Holy Trinity between 1863 and 1864, who then moved to their new church in 1885. It was because of this move to a newly built church that they decided to put on sale their old church Rue Bayard. This church was designed in a neo-Gothic style and could host about 400 persons. The recently purchased church then attracted high attendance to the services held during the Exposition Universelle of 1889.

Following World War II (when the church was unoccupied), the lack of maintenance led to structural problems and the church had to be rebuilt in the late 1950s. The rebuilding work, however, proved to be unsatisfactory. Major structural faults were soon discovered and by the 1980s the building was again in urgent need of replacement or major repairs. It was decided to completely rebuild, albeit with flats above the new church building. The church was designed by the Scottish architect Charles MacCallum, and includes screens by the sculptor, Jacqueline Stieger. The current church building was opened by the then Moderator of the General Assembly, John Miller, in 2002.

=== Famous visitors ===
The congregation has had many famous visitors, including Queen Elizabeth II who laid the foundation stone for the (since replaced) new sanctuary in 1957.

In 1924, during the Olympic Games held in Paris, the athlete Eric Liddell chose to preach at the Scots Kirk instead of running on a Sunday. His story is told in the film Chariots of Fire, but the building used as the Scots Kirk in the film was actually the former Broughton Church in Edinburgh.

During the negotiations for the Treaty of Versailles both the American President Woodrow Wilson and British Prime Minister David Lloyd George worshipped at the church.

== Current status ==
The current minister is Rev Jan Steyn who has been minister since April 2017.

The members of the congregation have been dispersed throughout the Île-de-France since the inception of the church. The Scottish diaspora being not numerous, the Scots Kirk Paris has a long history of being an international congregation. So though fully part of the Church of Scotland and conscious of its Scottish connections, the church always primarily seeks to offer English-language Presbyterian Christian worship and pastoral care to an international fellowship.

== See also ==
- American Cathedral in Paris
- International Presbytery (Church of Scotland)
- Protestantism in France
- Scots Kirk, Lausanne
