= Bludgeon =

Bludgeon may refer to:

- Club (weapon)
- Mace (bludgeon)
- Bludgeon, a Teenage Mutant Ninja Turtles character
- Luke Harper and Erick Rowan also known as the Bludgeon Brothers

== See also ==
- Bludgeoning
