= United Protestant Church in Belgium =

United Protestant Church in Belgium Verenigde Protestantse Kerk in België (in Dutch) Église Protestante Unie de Belgique (in French) Unierte Protestantische Kirche in Belgien (in German)
- Classification: Protestant
- Orientation: United (Calvinist and Lutheran)
- President: Steven Fuite
- Region: Belgium
- Headquarters: Anderlecht (Brussels)
- Origin: 1979
- Merger of: Protestant Church of Belgium; Reformed Church of Belgium; Circle of the Belgian Reformed Churches
- Official website: protestant.link

The United Protestant Church in Belgium (VPKB/EPUB) is the largest Protestant denomination in Belgium, but remains small in a country that has historically been, and remains predominantly, Catholic. The name of the church in Dutch is Verenigde Protestantse Kerk in België (VPKB) and in French is l'Église Protestante Unie de Belgique (EPUB). The church has about 50,000 members.

The current president of the church is Steven Fuite. The offices of the church are at Brogniezstraat or Rue Brogniez in Anderlecht (Brussels). The church is a member of the Conference of European Churches and the World Communion of Reformed Churches. In 2015, the church voted to ordain openly gay and lesbian pastors. Ordination of women and blessings of same-sex marriages are allowed.

== See also ==
- St Andrew's Church, Brussels
- Religion in Belgium
