= Kilchoman =

Parish on Islay, in Argyll and Bute, Scotland

Coordinates: 55.7819°N 6.4417°W

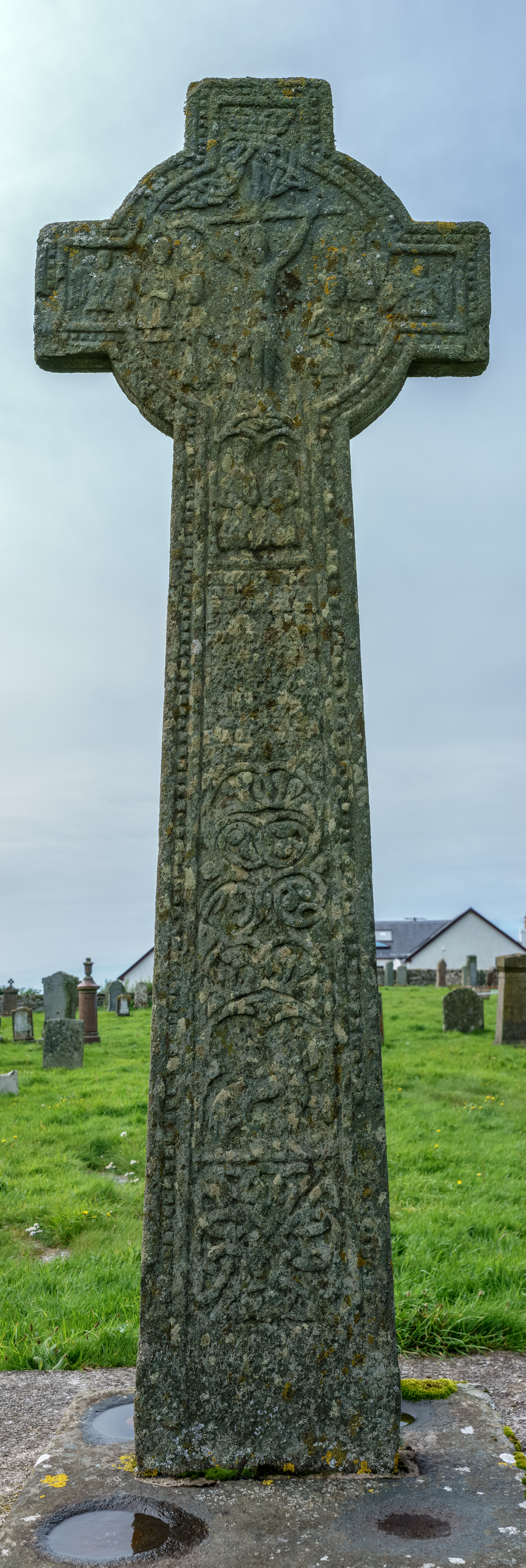
Kilchoman Cross

Kilchoman (/kɪlˈxoʊmən, -ˈhoʊ-/ kil-(K)HOH-mən; Scottish Gaelic: Cill Chomain [kʲʰiːʎ ˈxɔmɛɲ]) is a small settlement and large parish on the Scottish island of Islay, within the unitary council of Argyll and Bute.

== Settlement ==
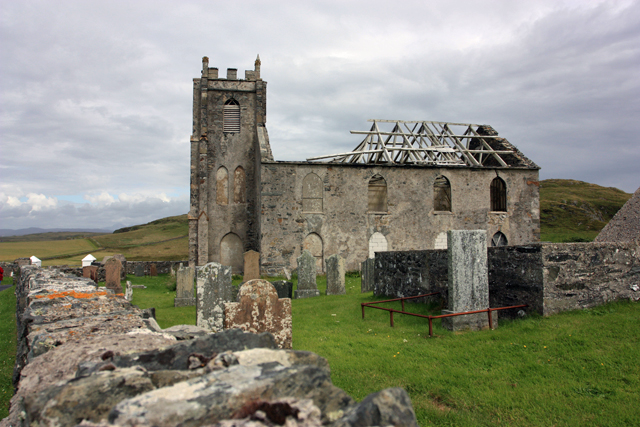
Ruined parish church

The settlement of Kilchoman consists of a small number of houses gathered around the 19th century church, a short way above the beach and dunes of Machir Bay, "locally known as Kilchoman Beach or Machrie Beach." The site is ancient, dating back to the early Christianization of the Argyll seaboard. The current-day church was built in 1827 to serve a large community that has since disappeared. It ceased use as a place of worship in 1977. Prior to 1827, a medieval church stood on the location of the now ruined church and before that, an early chapel stood there. The burial ground enclosing the church contains many medieval and renaissance sculptures, and notable high cross, the Kilchoman Cross, dating from the 14th or 15th century. The sculptor of the cross belonged to the Iona School.

Close to the settlement is another cemetery, the Kilchoman Military Cemetery, maintained by the Commonwealth War Graves Commission. This contains the remains of victims of the sinking of HMS Otranto in 1918.

A short distance east is Kilchoman Distillery.

Choughs breed in the area of farmland around the settlement, and the south shores of Loch Gorm, representing around 10% of the population of this vulnerable bird in the British Isles.

== Parish of Kilchoman ==
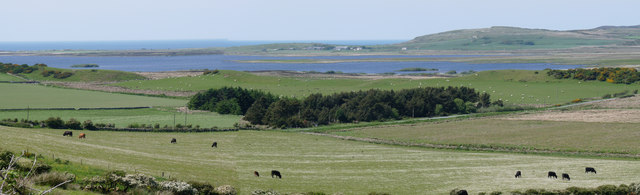
Loch Gorm in the central part of the parish

The parish covers the west part of Islay, covering the Rhinns of Islay, and the area around and north of Loch Gorm, and bounded to the east by Loch Gruinart and Loch Indaal totalling around 100 square miles (250 km^{2}). It thus includes the settlements of Ardnave, Bruichladdich, Claddach, Conisby, Kilchiaran, Kilnave, Nerabus, Port Charlotte, Portnahaven and Port Wemyss.

== See also ==
- List of listed buildings in Kilchoman, Argyll and Bute

== Bibliography ==
- Walker, Frank Arneil (2000). Argyll & Bute. Buildings of Scotland. Penguin. pp. 544–545. ISBN 978-0300096705.
- The New Statistical Account of Scotland: Renfrew, Argyle. W. Blackwood and Sons. 1845. pp. 644–659.
- Newton, Norman (1988). Islay. Newton Abbot, Devon: David & Charles. pp. 65–67. ISBN 9780715389966.
