= Eilean Mhic Coinnich =

Island in Argyll and Bute, Scotland

Eilean Mhic Coinnich (Gaelic)
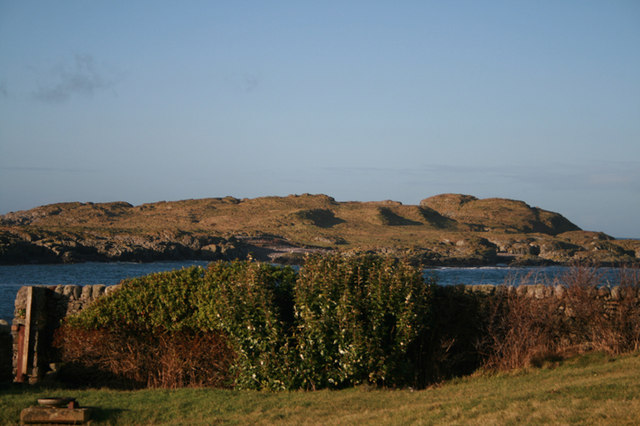
- Eilean Mhic Coinnich from Portnahaven

Location
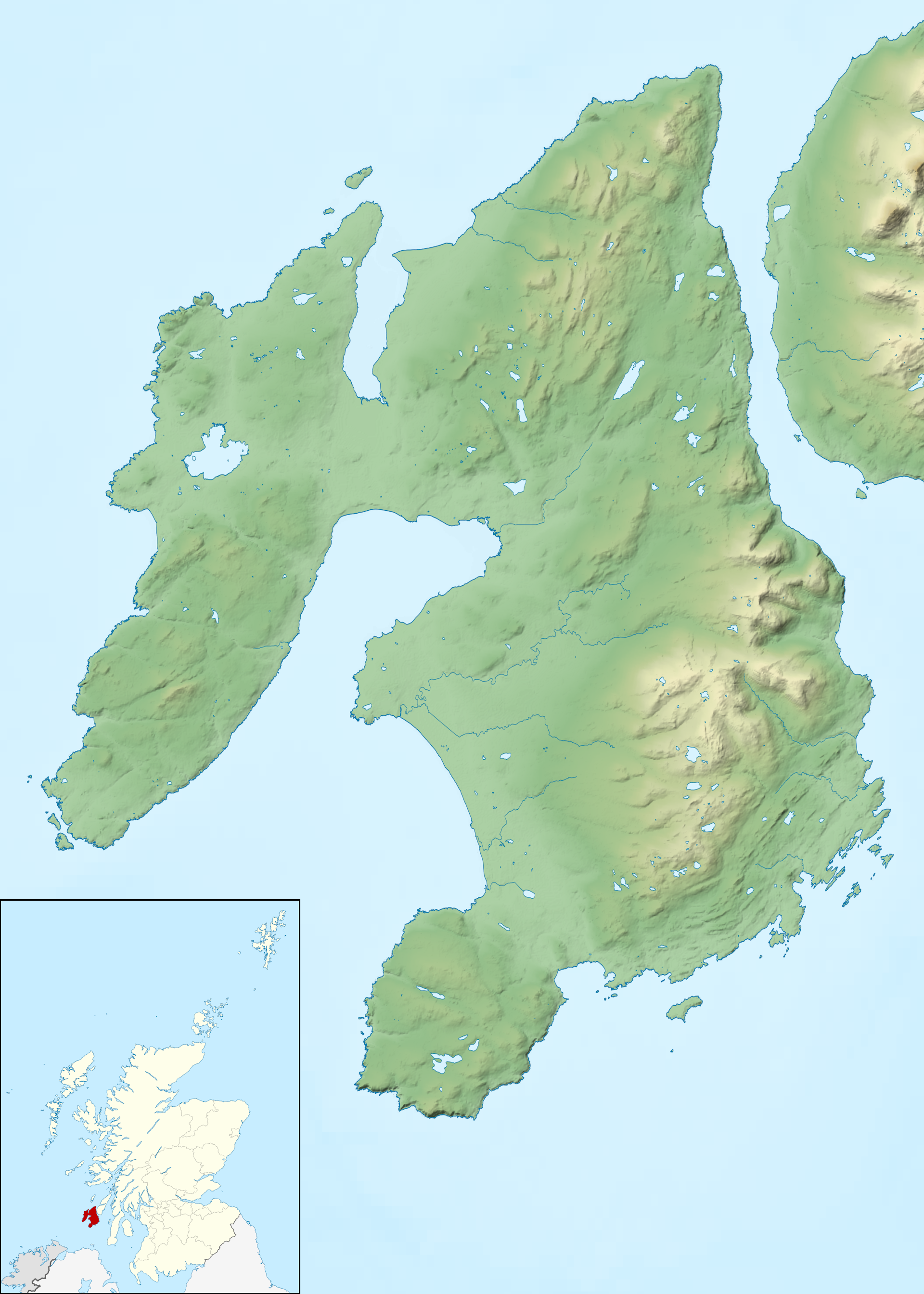
- En Mhic Coinnich shown next to Islay En Mhic Coinnich shown within Argyll and Bute
- OS grid reference: NR161523
- Coordinates: 55.681°N 6.518°W

Physical geography
- Island group: Islay
- Area: 17.3 ha (1/16 sq mi)
- Highest elevation: 10 m (33 ft)

Administration
- Council area: Argyll and Bute
- Country: Scotland
- Sovereign state: United Kingdom

Demographics
- Population: 0

Eilean Mhic Coinnich, also known as Mackenzie Island (although recorded on the Land Register as McKenseys Island), is an uninhabited island of 17.3 hectares (43 acres), lying off the southern end of the Rinns of Islay peninsula on the Inner Hebridean island of Islay, Scotland.

Lying just off the coast from the village of Portnahaven and north of the island of Orsay, Eilean Mhic Coinnich came onto the market in March 2008. At the time the vendor, Gilbert MacNab of Stirling, grazed cattle there. In 2010 it was available for offers "in the region of £90,000" and was sold for £55,000 in 2012 to Piers Casimir-Mrowczynski, a teacher from St Albans in England.
