= Easter Ellister =

Village on Islay, Argyll and Bute, Scotland

Coordinates: 55.69305°N 6.45574°W

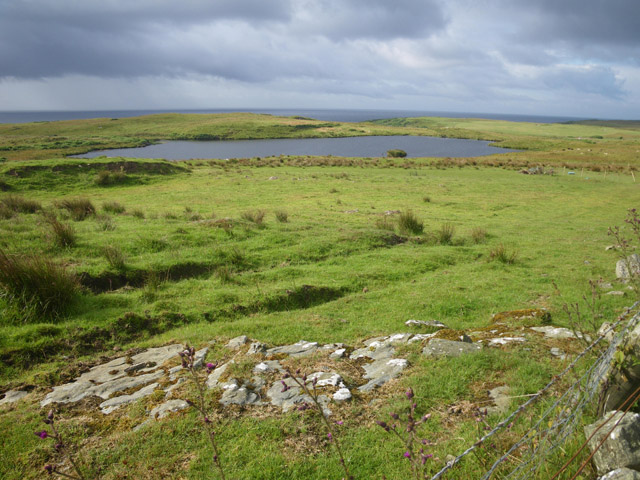
Coastal lochan near Easter Ellister.

Easter Ellister (Aolastradh) is a settlement on the Rinns of Islay on Islay in the Inner Hebrides of Scotland. It lies just off the A847 road between Portnahaven and Port Charlotte.
