= Colonsay Group =

Geological formation in Scotland

Coordinates: 56°4′N 6°13′W

- Stratigraphic range: Neoproterozoic
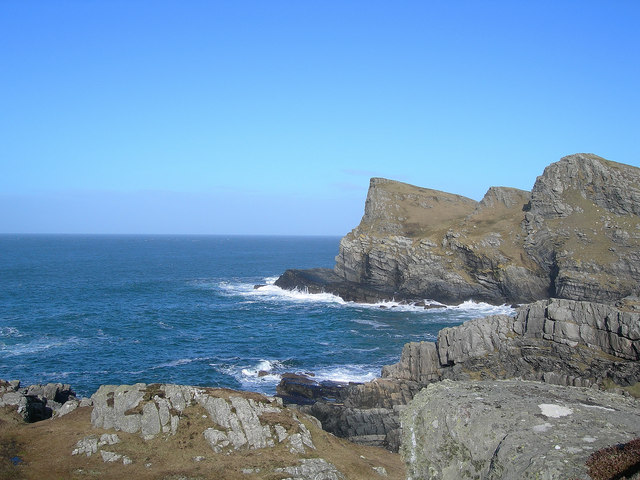
- Smaull Greywacke Formation, near Rubha Lamanais, Rinns of Islay
- Type: Group

Lithology
- Primary: Sandstone
- Other: Shale, siltstone

Location
- Region: Inner Hebrides
- Country: Scotland

Type section
- Named for: Colonsay

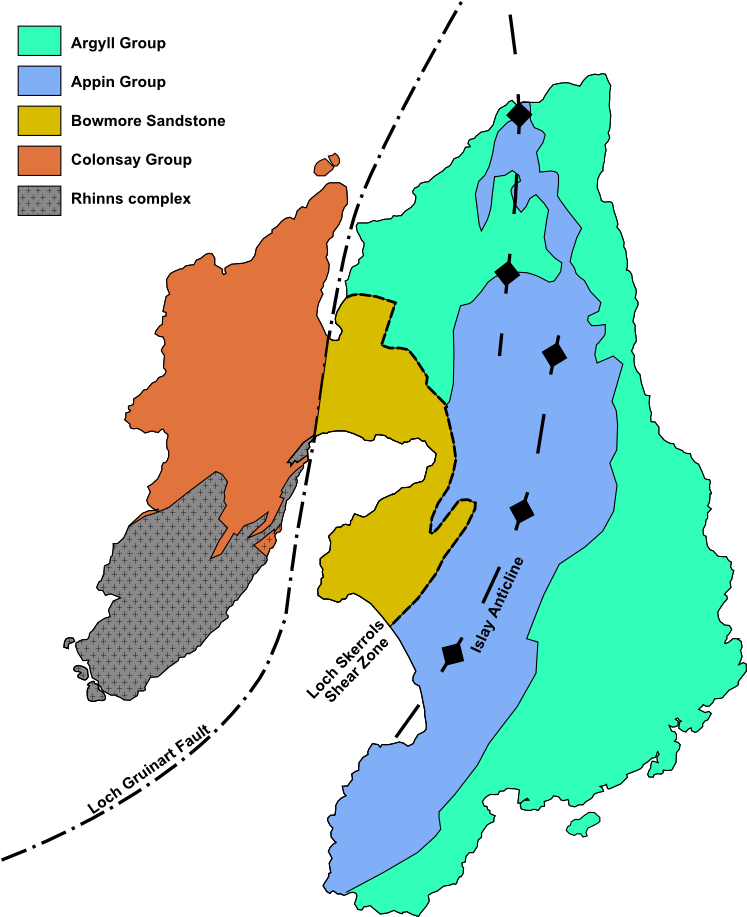
Geological map of Islay

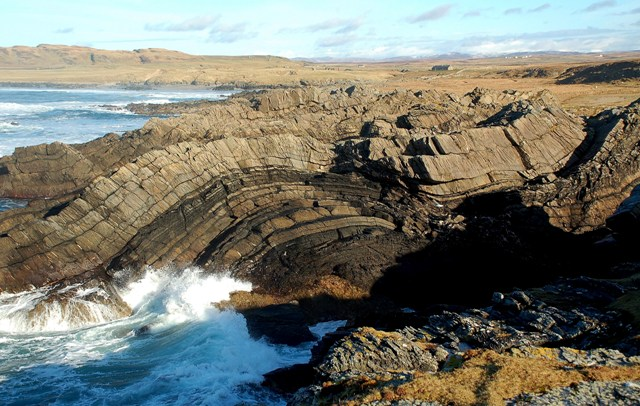
Folds in the Smaull Greywacke Formation at Campa on Islay

The Colonsay Group is an estimated 5,000 m thick sequence of mildly metamorphosed Neoproterozoic sedimentary rocks that outcrop on the islands of Colonsay, Islay and Oronsay and the surrounding seabed. They have been correlated with the Grampian Group, the oldest part of the Dalradian Supergroup.

== Stratigraphy ==
The sequences on Islay and Colonsay/Oronsay are not identical and correlation between them is uncertain. Both sequences are divided up into a series of formations. The Islay sequence lies unconformably on gneisses of the Rhinns complex and is thought to be mostly older than the Colonsay/Oronsay sequence. A possible correlation has been made between sandstones of the Oronsay formation which form the base of the preserved sequence on Colonsay/Oronsay and those of the Smaull and Sanaig Greywacke formations towards the top of the Islay sequence. Within Colonsay, the following sequence is recognised (in stratigraphical order with topmost/youngest first):

- Staosnaig Phyllite Formation
- Kiloran Flags Formation
- Milbuie Arkose Formation
- Kilchattan Formation
- Machrins Arkose Formation
- Dun Gallain Grit Formation
- Oronsay Greywacke Formation

== Age ==
The upper bound to the age of the sequence is given by the presence of detrital titanite grains that give an age of about 942 Ma and detrital zircon grains giving an age of about 1025 Ma, suggesting that the Colonsay Group is Neoproterozoic. The minimum age is given by dating of an intrusion that cuts the sequence at Kiloran Bay, which is dated to about 440 Ma (Early Silurian).

== Correlation ==
The Colonsay Group has at various times been correlated with the Torridonian, the Moine Supergroup and the Appin Group and Grampian Group of the lower Dalradian Supergroup. Analysis of the provenance area for the Colonsay Group compared to these other sequences, suggests that the best match in terms of provenance is with the Grampian Group, the lowermost part of the Dalradian sequence. The relationship of the Colonsay Group to the Bowmore Sandstone Group, with which they are in tectonic contact across the Loch Gruinart fault, is uncertain, although both have been correlated with the Grampian Group.
