= Nave Island =

Island in Scotland

Eilean Nèimh (Gaelic)
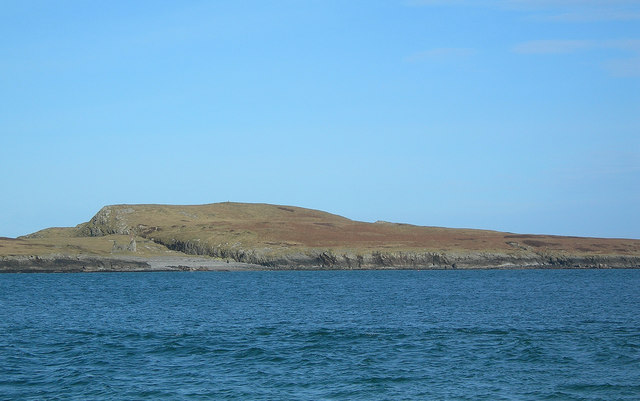
- Nave Island from Ardnave Point with the ruined chapel just visible at left

Location
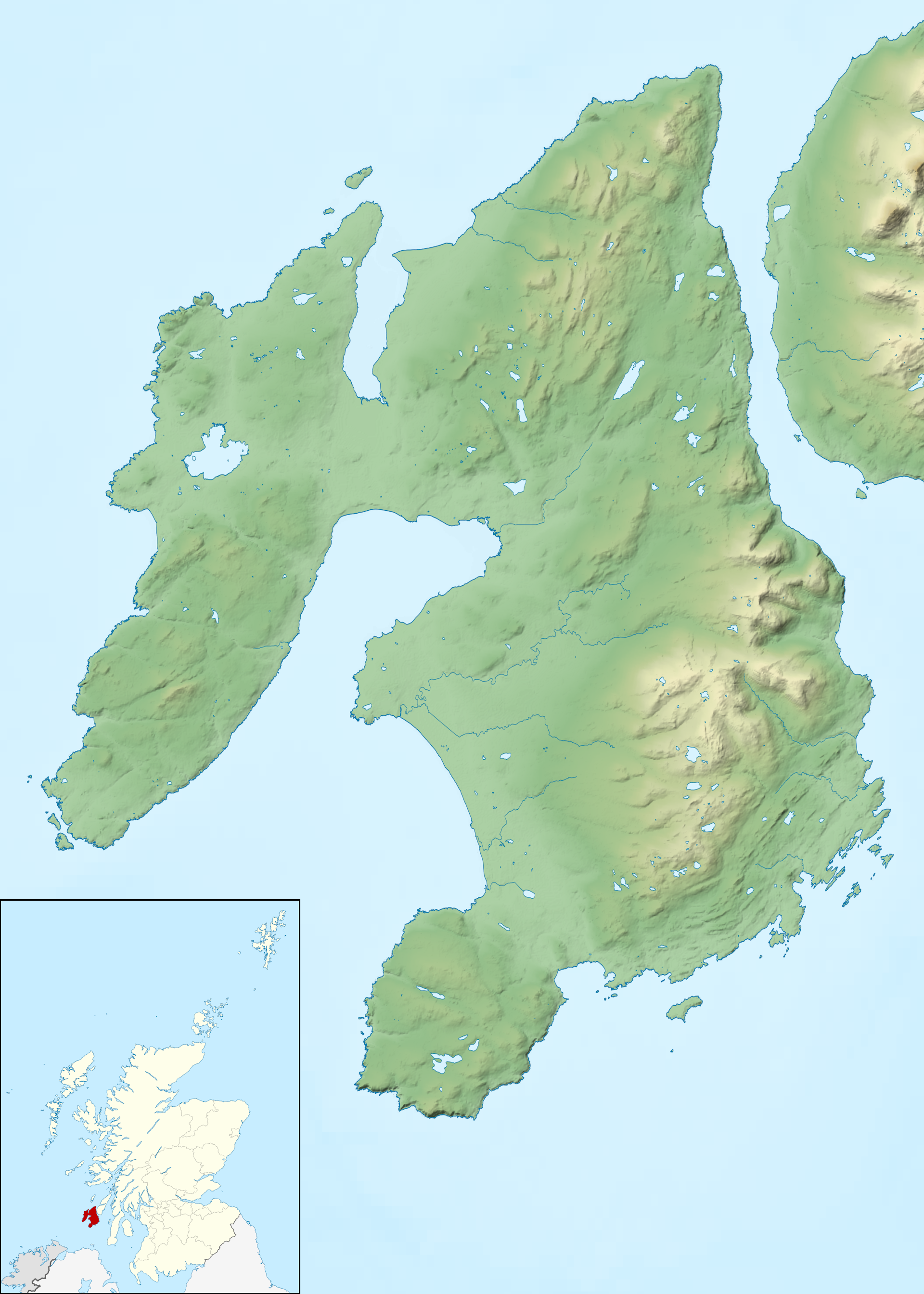
- Nave Island shown next to Islay Nave Island shown within Argyll and Bute
- OS grid reference: NR292759
- Coordinates: 55.9°N 6.33°W

Name
- Name meaning: "Ném's island"

Physical geography
- Island group: Islay
- Area: 40 ha (1/8 sq mi)
- Area rank: 220=
- Highest elevation: 34 m (112 ft)

Administration
- Council area: Argyll and Bute
- Country: Scotland
- Sovereign state: United Kingdom

Demographics
- Population: 0

Nave Island lies to the north of Islay in the Inner Hebrides near the mouth of Loch Gruinart. It is uninhabited.

== Geography ==
The island is all but cut in two by a narrow chasm that runs northwest to southeast across the northern third. The highest point is just north of this embayment at 34 metres (112 ft) above sea level. To the southwest lie a number of skerries and islets. These include Boghachan Mòra, Eilean Beag, Sgeireann Leathann, Sgeir nan Sgarbh and the Na Badagan rocks between the island and Ardnave Point on Islay. The Balach Rocks lie to the northeast.

The area of the island is recorded as 40 hectares (99 acres) in Rick Livingstone's tables, and Nave Island is also included by Hamish Haswell-Smith in his tabulation of Scottish islands of equal to or greater than 40 hectares (99 acres) in size. (Note: Haswell-Smith describes the measurement that gave rise to this addition to his list of islands at Haswell-Smith (2015) p. xii. Livingstone is not specific about his method of calculation.)

== Etymology ==
Watson (1926) states that Eilean Nèimh is named after a St Nem, although he was not certain which one. He was aware of four saints called Ném and another three called Némán and preferred the latter as this name is a "diminutive of Ném". Mac an Tàilleir (2003) follows this and gives a derivation from "Ném's island". St Nem Mac Ua Birn the Abbot of Aran, died 14 June 654 is presumably a contender.

However, King and Cotter (2012) suggest that Ardnave Point is from Àird an Naoimh and means "height of the saint"—a much more general ecclesiastical derivation.

== History ==
The presence of substantial carved Celtic cross at Kilnave on the shores of Loch Gruinart and the fragment of another found on the island itself suggest the presence of organised Christianity at an early date. There is a ruined chapel immediately to the south of the cross-island chasm and an earthen rampart surrounding it hint at a monastic settlement. Adomnán's late 7th-century Vita Columbae refers to a monastery at Elena Insula that may refer to this site.

In 1549, Dean Monro wrote: "on the north coist of Ila, beside the entresse of Lochgrunord, layes ane iyle, called by the Erish Ellan-nese, with ane kirke in it. This iyle is half ane myle in lenthe, fair maynland, inhabit and manurit, guid for fishing." (Note: Translation from Scots: on the north coast of Islay, beside the entrance to Loch Gruinart, lies an isle, called in Gaelic Ellan-nese, with a church on it. This isle is half a mile in length, fair land, inhabited and manured, good for fishing.) Johan Blaeu's Atlas of 1654 refers to the island as "Ylen Naomh".

Martin Martin listed seven churches on Islay at the end of the 17th century, including a chapel on Nave Island.

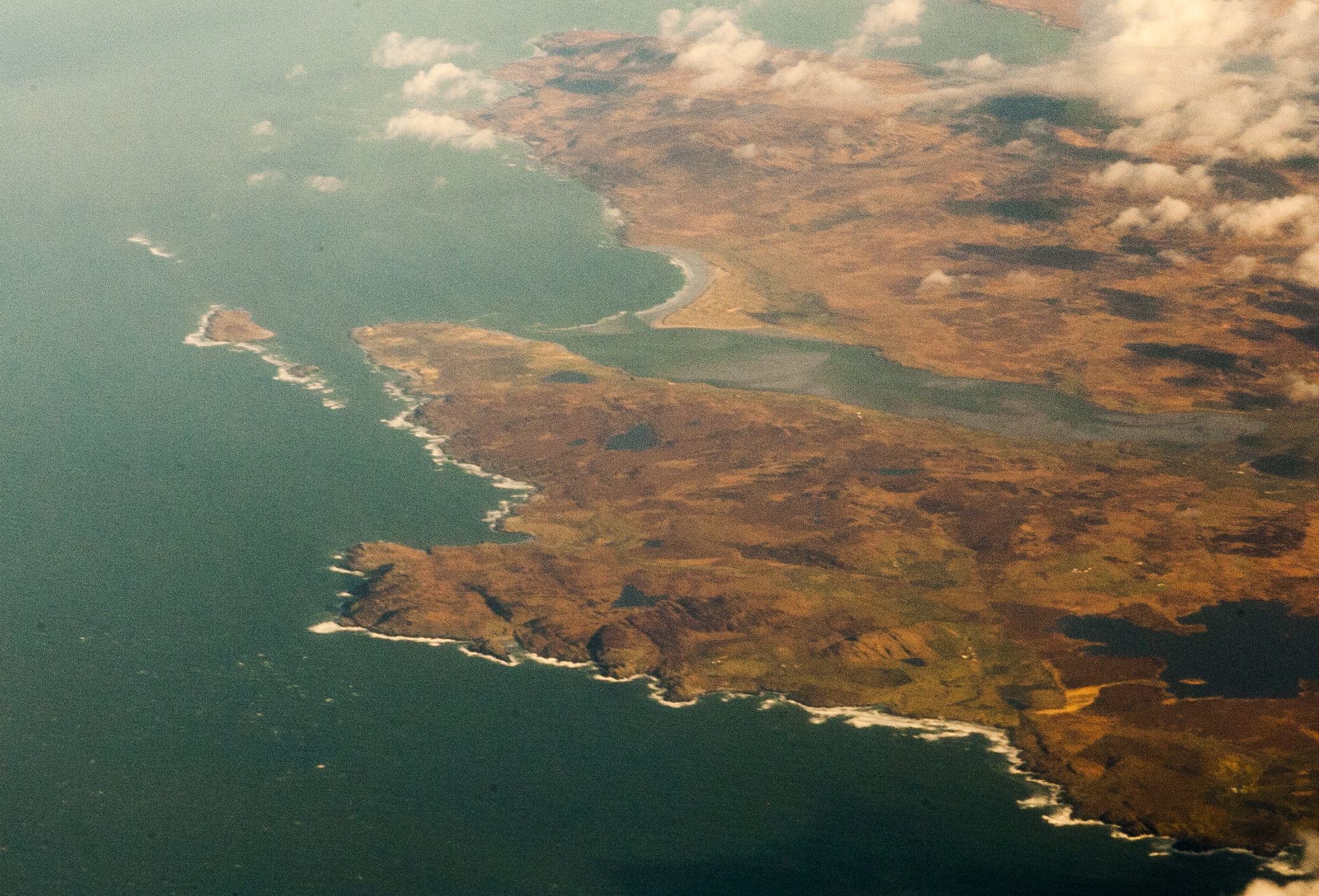
Loch Gruinart and northwest Islay from the air with Ardnave Point and Nave Island at left centre

The late 18th-century kelp boom that influenced the economy of the Hebrides was not as important on Islay as elsewhere and the industry collapsed suddenly throughout Scotland in 1830 after the removal of tariffs on imported alkali. The only remaining substantial evidence of its existence on Islay and environs are a furnace and traces of kilns on Nave Island.
