= Clark Cottage =

Clark Cottage may refer to:

- Clark Cottage, New Zealand, a historic cottage located in Hobsonville, Auckland
- Clark Cottage, Scotland, a historic cottage located in Port Charlotte on the island of Islay
