= Machir Bay =

Bay in the Inner Hebrides of Scotland

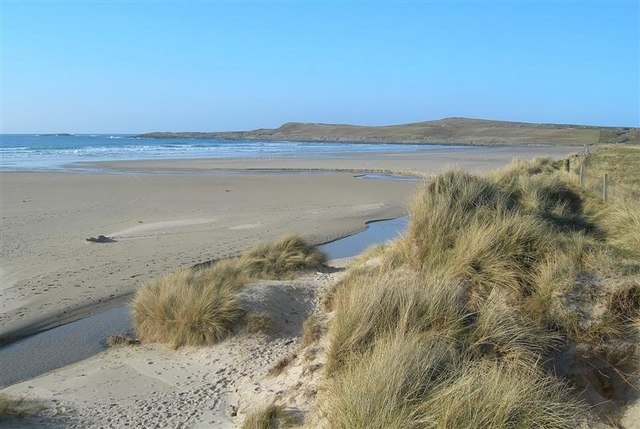
- View of Machir Bay facing north-northwest

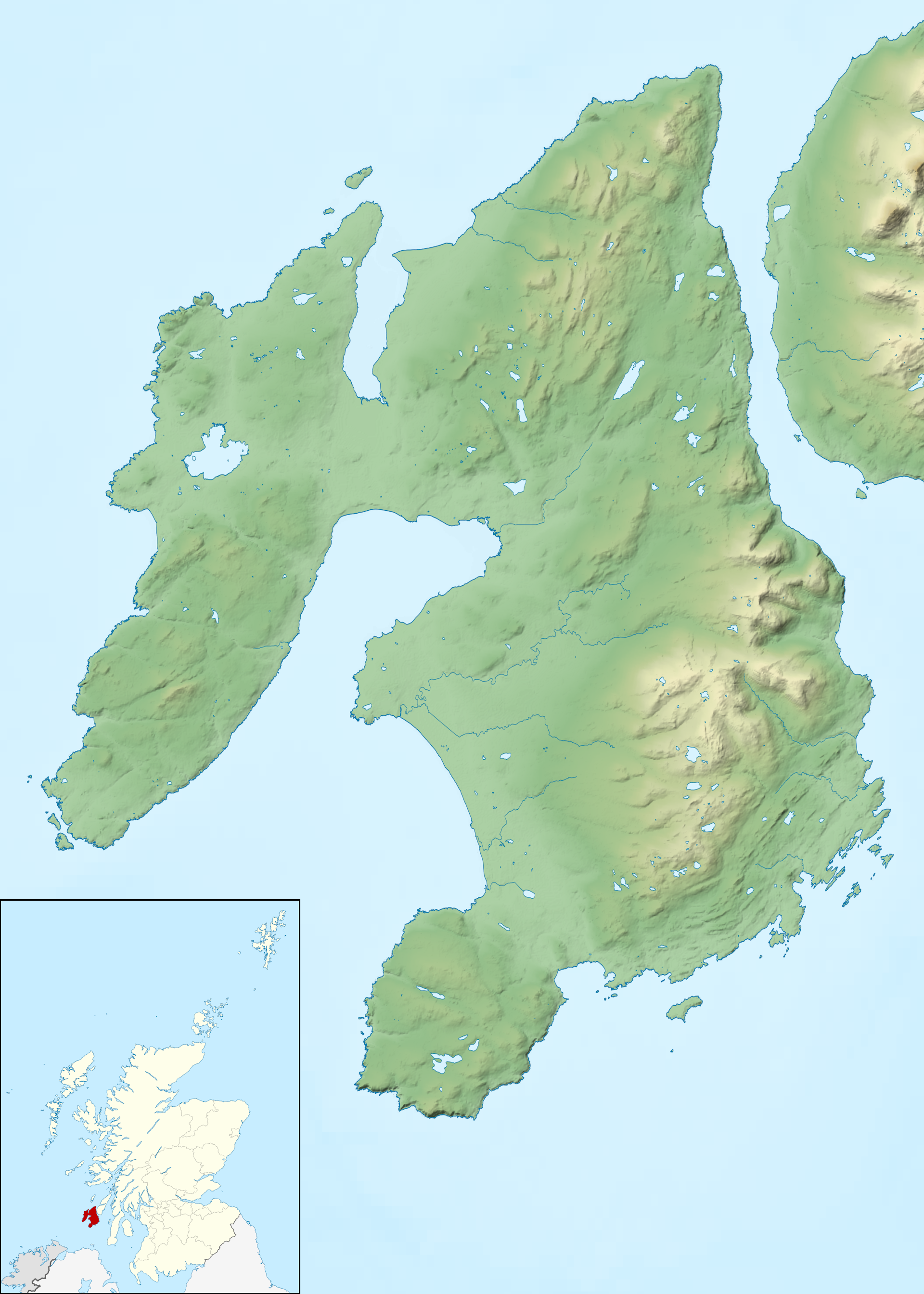
- Location within Islay
- Location: Scotland
- Coordinates: 55°46′40″N 6°28′10″W
- Ocean/sea sources: North Atlantic Ocean
- Max. length: 2.8 km (1.74 mi)
- Max. width: 1.2 km (0.75 mi)
- Settlements: Kilchoman

Machir Bay is a small bay on the Western coast of the isle of Islay in the Inner Hebrides of Scotland. It is one of the features of the Rhinns of Islay and lies within a few hundred metres of the small settlement of Kilchoman. To the north, the cape of Coul Point separates Machir Bay from Saligo Bay. Kilchiaran Bay lies immediately to the south.

The northern and southern parts of Machir Bay are largely rocky, with a sandy beach area near the top of the bay. Several small streams flow into the bay, notably Allt na Criche and Allt Gleann na Ceardaich, both of which flow into the north of the bay.

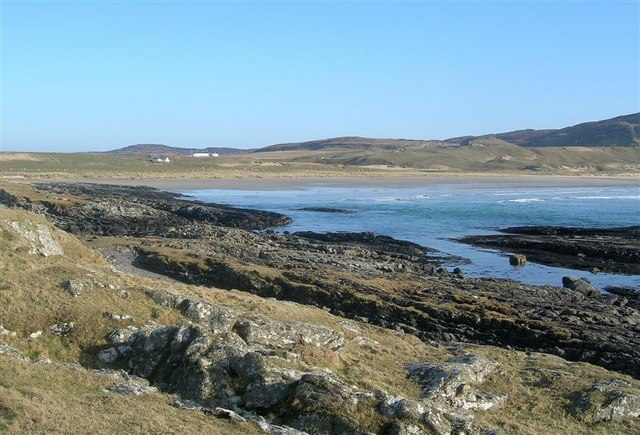
Machir Bay from the north, facing southeast

== Area ==
The area surrounding Machir Bay is sparsely populated today, but archeological evidence shows a long history of human settlement. There are remnants of two duns to the southeast of the bay: one, Dun Neadean is located on a rocky knoll by the coastline, near the old road between Kilchoman and another small hamlet to the south, Kilchiaran. The enclosed area covers an area of 20 metres by 13. There remains little more of the 3.5 metre-thick wall than foundations covered in grass. The second dun, Dun Chroisprig is also located on a hill. Its outer wall roughly encompasses the hill, with a diameter of about 13 metres. An entrance 1.5 metres in width faces to the west-northwest.

== Shipwrecks ==
On 18 November 1835, the Stella, a vessel from Palermo bound for Greenock, ran aground at Machir Bay. The entire crew and part of the cargo were saved.

On 16 November 1888, during a storm, a Norwegian barque, La Plata, sailing from Newcastle to Buenos Aires and carrying coal and coke, was wrecked at Machir Bay due to the sudden shift of unsecured cargo, causing the ship to list and run aground after becoming uncontrollable. 3 of 12 crewmen were lost.

Perhaps the most famous incident was the wreck of HMS Otranto in October 1918, shortly before the end of the Great War. A navigation error caused it to collide with HMS Kashmir. The casualty toll was estimated at 470 men, which makes it one of the worst convoy accidents of the war.

== Miscellaneous ==
One of the whiskies made at the nearby Kilchoman distillery is named after Machir Bay.

A charity on Islay - Islay Development Initiative - has a range of candles made with Islay beeswax from their apiary of native dark European bees, named after beaches on the island using scents of plants found on each beach. Machir Bay scent is spearmint and chamomile. The Charity uses funds raised to support Islay BeachWatch, which keeps the beaches clear of marine litter.
