= List of listed buildings in Kilchoman, Argyll and Bute =

This is a list of listed buildings in the parish of Kilchoman on Islay in Argyll and Bute, Scotland.

== List ==
Name	Location	Date Listed	Grid Ref. (Note: Sometimes known as OSGB36, the grid reference (where provided) is based on the British national grid reference system used by the Ordnance Survey. • "Guide to National Grid". Ordnance Survey. • "Get-a-map". Ordnance Survey.)	Geo-coordinates	Notes	LB Number (Note: Historic Environment Scotland assign a unique alphanumeric identifier to each designated site in Scotland, for listed buildings this always begins with "LB", for example "LB12345".)	Image
Portnahaven School				55°40′49″N 6°30′03″W	Category B	12437	Upload another image
Kilchiaran Farmhouse				55°45′21″N 6°27′03″W	Category B	11898	Upload another image
Bruichladdich Gorton Schoolhouse And Former School				55°46′48″N 6°21′09″W	Category B	11911	Upload another image
Houses, Main Street Sraid Ard (E. Side, Middle) 1. Mclellan 2. Clark 3. Kidd 4. Gillies 5. Mckinven 6 Rothschild				55°44′21″N 6°22′41″W	Category B	11928	Upload Photo
Police Station And House (Lochview), Rathad Na Roinne (W. Side)				55°44′12″N 6°22′54″W	Category C(S)	11937	Upload another image
Houses Bruthach Dubh W. Side 1. Boyle 2. Leitch 3. Maclean 4. Gillespie 5. Mactaggart And Henderson 6. Donald 7. Macindeor 8. Mcdougall 9. Mackintosh				55°44′24″N 6°22′44″W	Category B	11948	Upload another image
"Rhu" By Port Na Ceasach, 1. Dick, 2. Mclelland				55°44′17″N 6°22′43″W	Category B	12436	Upload Photo
Hugh Mackay's Grave, (Tung Mhic Aoidh Na Ranna)				55°40′32″N 6°30′45″W	Category B	11895	Upload Photo
St. Ciaran's Chapel Kilchiaran				55°45′12″N 6°27′25″W	Category B	11897	Upload another image
Kilchiaran Steading				55°45′19″N 6°27′12″W	Category B	11899	Upload Photo
Nave Island Chapel Nave Island				55°53′58″N 6°20′01″W	Category B	11909	Upload another image
26, 27, 28 & 29 Shore Street (Sraid A'Chladdaich) (Middle)				55°44′21″N 6°22′39″W	Category B	11924	Upload Photo
House, (Woodrow & Ross) Bruthach An Diolladair				55°44′20″N 6°22′41″W	Category C(S)	11927	Upload another image
Houses, Main Street (Sraid Ard) (W. Side, N. End) 1) Macarther, 2) Mcindeor 3) Miss Mcindeor 4) Fergusson 5) Mciver 6) Grier				55°44′24″N 6°22′43″W	Category B	11929	Upload another image
Houses, Main St. Sraid Ard (W. Side, S. End) 1) Mclelland, 2) Mcsween 3) Fergusson 4) Beattie				55°44′19″N 6°22′45″W	Category B	11931	Upload Photo
'Laggan View' Rathad Na Roinne (W. Side)				55°44′17″N 6°22′47″W	Category C(S)	11933	Upload Photo
Portnahaven Church Of Scotland				55°40′52″N 6°30′25″W	Category B	11940	Upload another image
Bonded Warehouses Lochindaal Distillery				55°44′28″N 6°22′44″W	Category C(S)	11947	Upload Photo
Port Charlotte Hotel				55°44′25″N 6°22′42″W	Category C(S)	11949	Upload another image
Houses, Cnoc Iain Phail And Shore Street (Sraid A'Chladdaich) (N. End) 1) Storehouse, 2) Maciore, 3) Toirre, 4) Mactaggart And Maclean, 5) Johnson				55°44′23″N 6°22′39″W	Category B	13793	Upload Photo
Brookfield (Old Manse)				55°40′52″N 6°30′11″W	Category C(S)	11942	Upload Photo
Atlantic View (Fergusson's)				55°40′48″N 6°30′21″W	Category C(S)	11943	Upload Photo
St. Oran's Chapel				55°40′32″N 6°30′45″W	Category B	11945	Upload another image
Kilchoman Manse, Bruichladdich - Port Charlotte Road				55°44′53″N 6°22′28″W	Category C(S)	11946	Upload Photo
Houses 1. Mckinnon 2. Thomson				55°40′35″N 6°30′18″W	Category B	13792	Upload Photo
Port Charlotte Road, Kilchoman New Parish Church (St Ciaran's), Bruichladdich				55°45′06″N 6°22′22″W	Category B	13818	Upload Photo
Foreland House				55°47′41″N 6°21′27″W	Category B	11901	Upload Photo
Lochindaal Hotel And Houses Main Street (Sraid Ard) (W. Side Middle) 1) Macdonald, 2) Carmichael, 3) Hotel, 4) Bar, 5) Miss Gillespie 6) Gillespie				55°44′20″N 6°22′43″W	Category B	11930	Upload another image
Kilchoman Old Parish Church Kilchoman				55°46′55″N 6°26′30″W	Category B	11902	Upload another image See more images
Kilnave Chapel (Cill Naoimh), Kilnave Burial Ground				55°51′37″N 6°20′25″W	Category B	11905	Upload another image
Houses, Rathad Na Roinne (W. Side) 1. W. Campbell 2. S. Campbell				55°44′16″N 6°22′48″W	Category C(S)	11934	Upload Photo
Old Blacksmith's House (Burke) Rathad Na Roinne (W. Side)				55°44′15″N 6°22′49″W	Category C(S)	11935	Upload Photo
Bruichladdich Distillery				55°45′58″N 6°21′43″W	Category C(S)	11900	Upload another image
Kilchoman Cross, Kilchoman Burial Ground				55°46′54″N 6°26′30″W	Category B	11903	Upload another image See more images
Kilnave Cross, Kilnave Burial Ground				55°51′37″N 6°20′25″W	Category B	11906	Upload another image
Craigens Farmhouse And Steading				55°49′19″N 6°18′59″W	Category B	11910	Upload Photo
22, 23 & 24 Shore Street (Sraid A'Chladdaich) (S. End)				55°44′20″N 6°22′40″W	Category B	11925	Upload Photo
House (Campbell) Bruthach An Diolladair				55°44′20″N 6°22′41″W	Category C(S)	11926	Upload Photo
House, (Mctaggart) Rathad Na Roinne (W. Side)				55°44′15″N 6°22′50″W	Category C(S)	11936	Upload Photo
"Achnamara" Rathad Na Roinne (E. Side)				55°44′16″N 6°22′47″W	Category C(S)	11938	Upload Photo
Port Charlotte Village Sraid Na Sgoile Port Charlotte Village Hall				55°44′20″N 6°22′49″W	Category B	11941	Upload another image
Cottage (Belonging To Ferguson, Farmer) Near Balmenach				55°41′28″N 6°30′12″W	Category B	11896	Upload Photo
Ardnave Steading				55°52′26″N 6°20′45″W	Category B	11908	Upload Photo
Rhinns Of Islay Lighthouse				55°40′23″N 6°30′48″W	Category A	11944	Upload another image See more images
Kilchoman House (Old Manse) Kilchoman				55°46′52″N 6°26′27″W	Category B	11904	Upload another image
Ardnave House				55°52′25″N 6°20′42″W	Category B	11907	Upload another image
Cottage, Rathad Na Roinne (W. Side)				55°44′17″N 6°22′46″W	Category C(S)	11932	Upload Photo
Cottage, (Clark) Rathad Na Roinne (E. Side)				55°44′16″N 6°22′47″W	Category C(S)	11939	Upload Photo

== Key ==
The scheme for classifying buildings in Scotland is:

- Category A: "buildings of national or international importance, either architectural or historic; or fine, little-altered examples of some particular period, style or building type."
- Category B: "buildings of regional or more than local importance; or major examples of some particular period, style or building type, which may have been altered."
- Category C: "buildings of local importance; lesser examples of any period, style, or building type, as originally constructed or moderately altered; and simple traditional buildings which group well with other listed buildings."

In March 2016 there were 47,288 listed buildings in Scotland. Of these, 8% were Category A, and 50% were Category B, with the remaining 42% being Category C.

== See also ==
- List of listed buildings in Argyll and Bute
