= River Sorn =

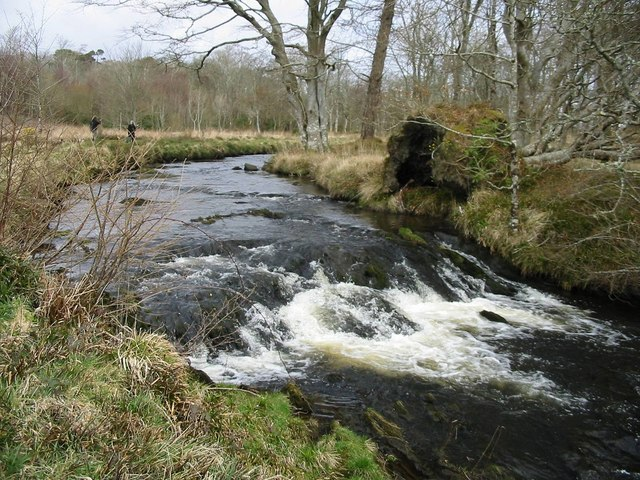
- River Sorn near Redhouses

Location
- Island: Islay
- Region: Argyll and Bute
- Country: Scotland

Physical characteristics
- Source
  - location: Loch Finlaggan
  - coordinates: 55°49′27″N 6°11′04″W
- Mouth
  - location: Bridgend
  - coordinates: 55°46′42″N 6°15′20″W

The River Sorn is a small river on the Scottish island of Islay in Argyll and Bute. Draining Loch Finlaggan and having gathered the waters of the Allt Ruadh and the Ballygrant Burn, it flows southwestwards to enter the sea at the village of Bridgend at the head of Loch Indaal.
