= Rinns of Islay Lighthouse =

Rhinns of Islay Lighthouse
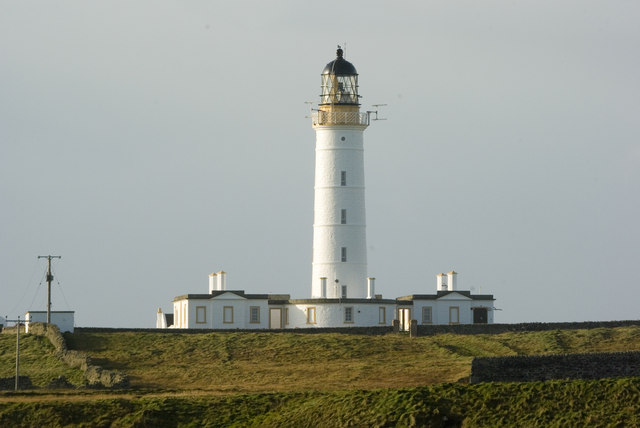
- Location: Orsay
- OS grid: NR1634551414
- Coordinates: 55°40′23″N 6°30′48″W

Tower
- Constructed: 1825
- Built by: Robert Stevenson
- Automated: 31 March 1998
- Height: 29 metres
- Power source: solar power
- Operator: Northern Lighthouse board
- Heritage: category A listed building

Light
- First lit: 1825
- Focal height: 46 m (151 ft)
- Light source: Electric operation with sealed beam light, mounted on a gearless revolving pedestal.
- Intensity: 600,000 candela
- Range: 18 nautical miles
- Characteristic: Flashing White every 5 seconds

The Rinns of Islay Lighthouse (also spelled Rhinns) is situated on the island of Orsay. The structural engineer for the lighthouse was Robert Stevenson and it came into use in 1825. In 1879 William Thomson (Lord Kelvin) considered Rinns of Islay one of the "three best revolving lights in the world"

== History ==
Rinns of Islay is built on a small island, Orsay, which sits near the coast of the island of Islay. The lighthouse was constructed by John Gibb of Aberdeen at a cost of between £8,000 to £9,000. At that time, Robert Stevenson was experimenting with ways of giving the lights individual features so that each light house could be identified. Rhinns of Islay light alternated between stationary and revolving and gave a flash of light every 12 seconds. This made it different to those on the coast because it didn't have dark intervals between the flashing. The light was beamed by the use of a reflector positioned behind a flame.

The lighthouse was permanently staffed and supplies were delivered by boatmen permanently attached to the station. This was a risky role having to navigate stormy waters. there were few accidents, although during 1877–78 some boats were driven ashore, damaged, swamped or lost.

== Operation ==
At around 1907 a porch was added to the balcony around the light to protect the keepers from stormy weather. The light was electrified in 1978 giving it 600.000cp with a sealed beam. It was listed as a Category A listed building on 20 July 1971.

== Other sources ==
- Rhinns of Islay Lighthouse
- Phare de Rinns of Islay
- lLatarnia morska Rinns of Islay
- Rinns of Islay fyr
