= A847 road =

Road in Scotland

A847

Route information
- Length: 14.7 mi (23.7 km)

Major junctions
- North end: Bridgend; 55°46′55″N 6°14′56″W
- A846
- South end: Portnahaven; 55°40′51″N 6°30′23″W

Location
- Country: United Kingdom
- Constituent country: Scotland

Road network
- Roads in the United Kingdom; Motorways; A and B road zones

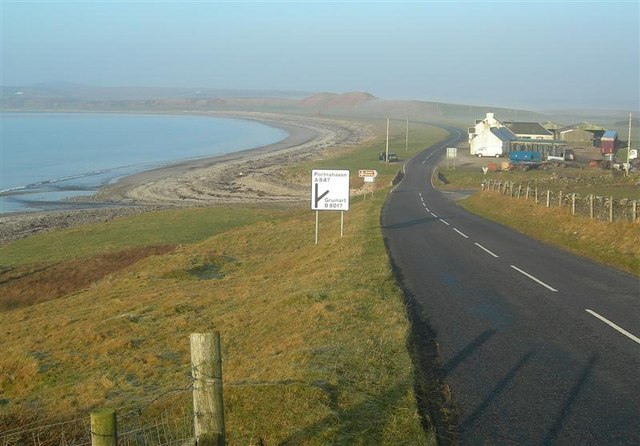
The A847 at Uiskentuie

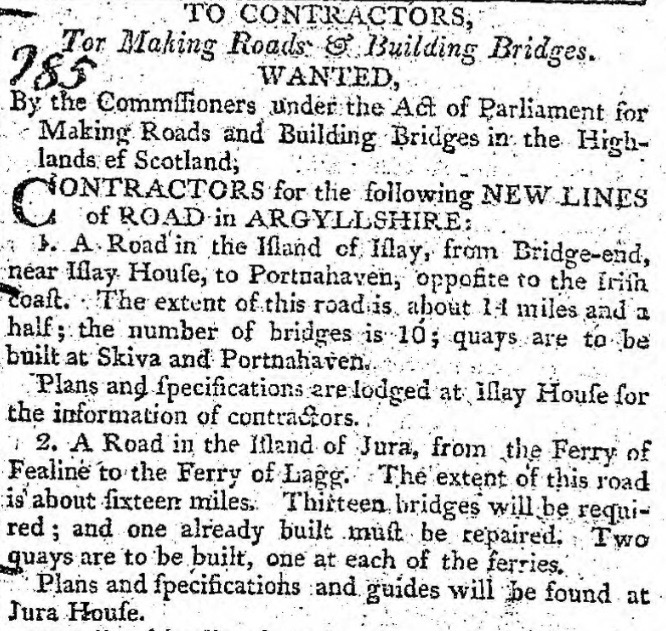
Advertisement for construction from the Caledonian Mercury 18 November 1805

The A847 road is one of the two principal roads of Islay in the Inner Hebrides off the west coast of mainland Scotland.

It connects Bridgend, at a junction with the A846 road, with Portnahaven at the southern end of the Rinns of Islay peninsula. It is some 14 1/2 miles (23 km) long.

The road was completed in 1806 following the route surveyed by John Langlands of Campbeltown.

== Settlements on or near the A847 ==
North to South

- Bridgend
- Blackrock
- Bruichladdich
- Port Charlotte
- Nerabus (Nereabolls)
- Easter Ellister
- Portnahaven
