= Harling (wall finish) =

Rough-cast wall lime

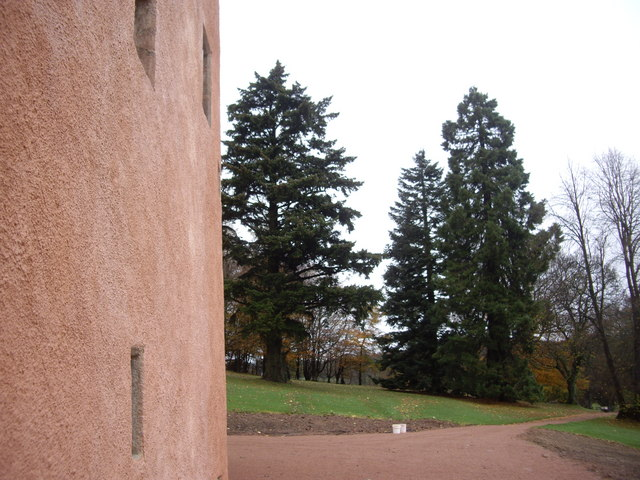
Close view of the harling at Craigievar Castle

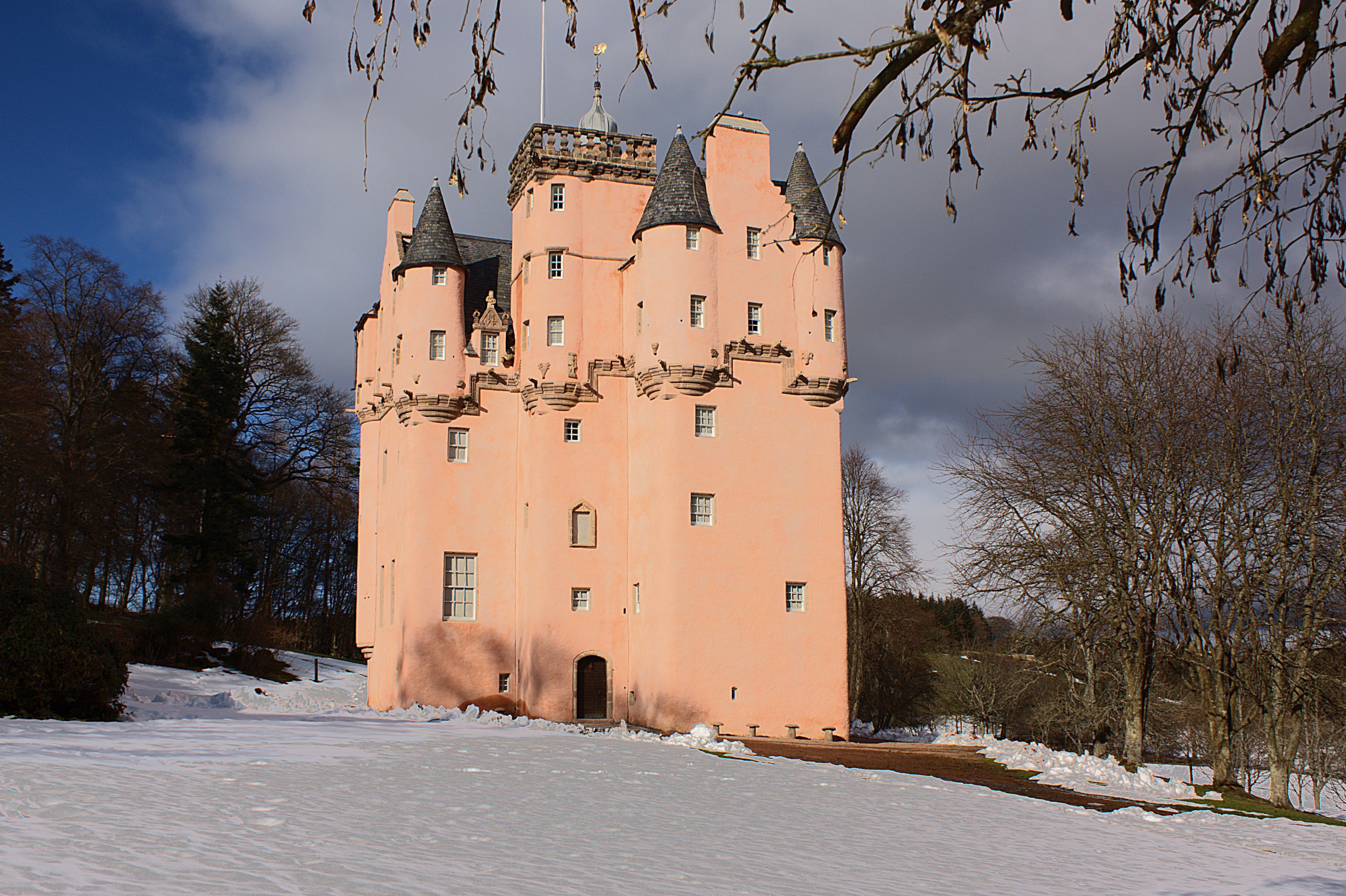
Craigievar Castle

Harling is a rough-cast wall finish consisting of lime and aggregate, known for its rough texture. Many castles and other buildings in Scotland and Ulster have walls finished with harling. It is also used on contemporary buildings, where it protects against the wet Scottish and Ulster climates and eliminates the need for paint.

== Technique ==
Harling as a process covers stonework using a plastering process involving a slurry of small pebbles or fine chips of stone. After a wall is complete and has been pointed and allowed to cure then a base of lime render is applied to the bare stone. While this render is still wet a specially shaped trowel is used to throw the pebbles onto the lime surface, which are then lightly pressed into it. Harl, being mostly lime render, cures chemically rather than simply drying. After this setting process, the harl is sometimes lime washed in a colour using traditional techniques.

It is not recommendable to replace more than around 20% of the lime content with cement. Cement-based render is very stiff and prone to crack or detach from the wall when subjected to stress induced by expansion due to solar radiation and moisture. It is also less permeable to moisture and water vapour. Water entering through fine cracks in the surface does not easily diffuse and can penetrate into the softer stone, thus causing the deterioration which harling aims to prevent. For similar reasons, modern barrier paints should not be used in place of traditional lime washes.

An example of the inadequate protection afforded by high cement harling is the Charles Rennie Mackintosh designed Hill House completed in 1904 using the newly available but poorly understood Portland cement harling. Over the years water had penetrated the harling and threatened the overall integrity of the building. The National Trust for Scotland, the building's owner, has (2019) enclosed Hill House in a transparent 'box' which will allow some rain to enter but which will eventually allow it to dry naturally. It is estimated that this will take seven to ten years, after which the box will be removed.

== Examples ==
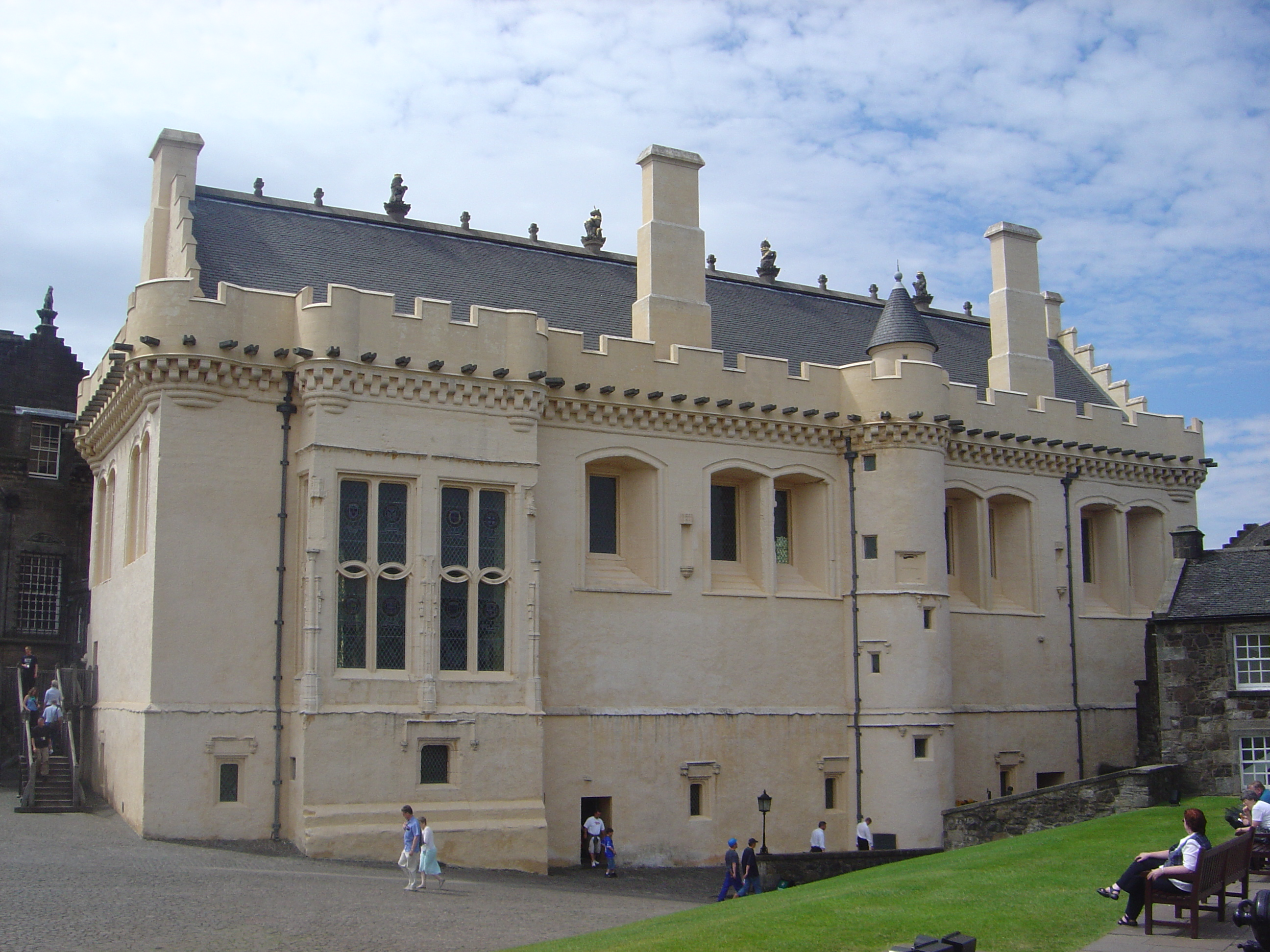
The Great Hall at Stirling Castle

The technique of harling features in a large number of famous Scottish buildings including:

- Clark Cottage, Scotland on the island of Islay
- Crathes Castle in Aberdeenshire (16th century)
- Craigievar Castle in Aberdeenshire (17th century)
- Muchalls Castle in Aberdeenshire
- Myres Castle in Fife (1530 onwards)
- Stirling Castle in Stirling
- Castle of Park (Aberdeenshire)

== Historic record ==
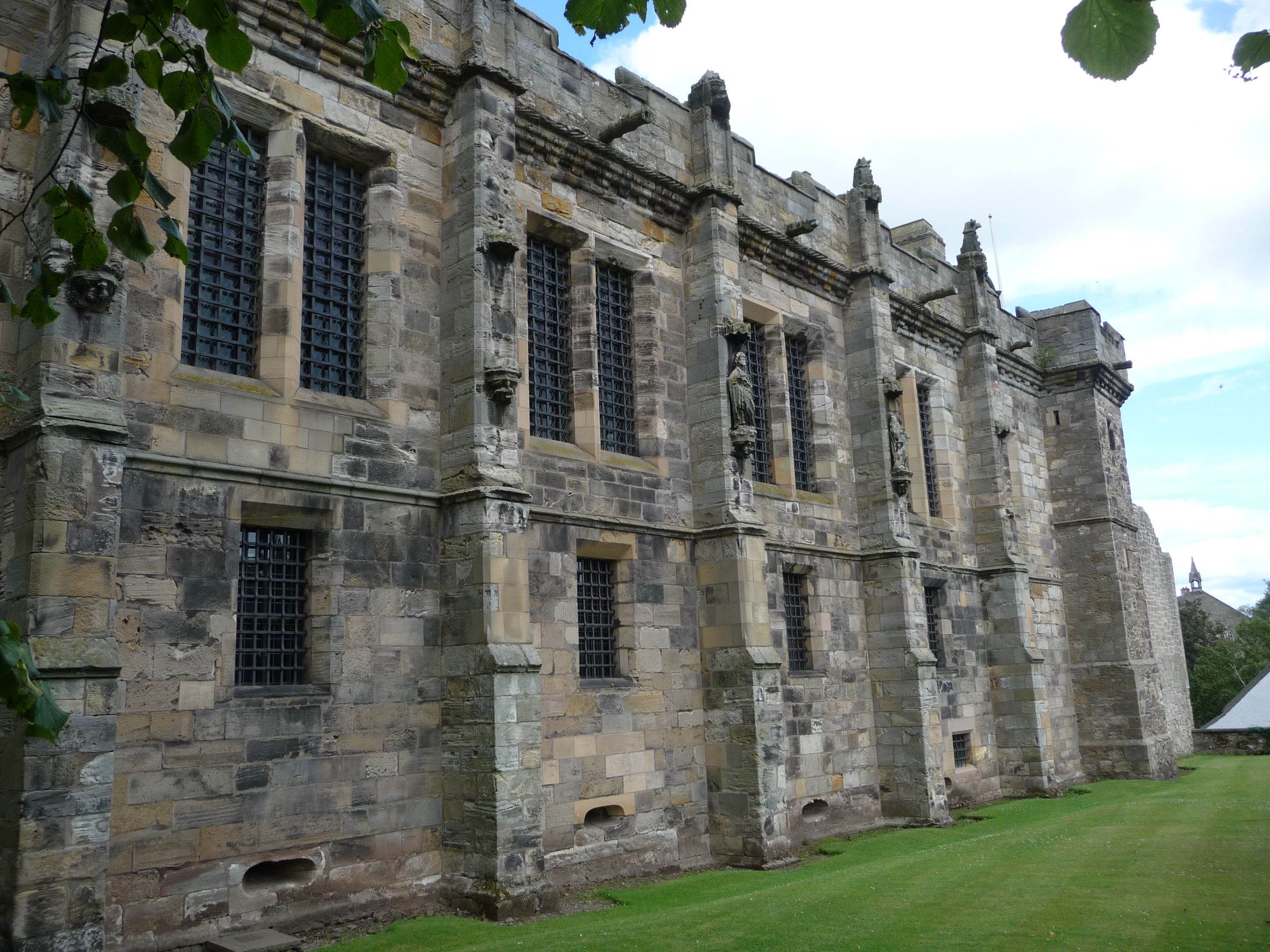
The East turnpike turret at Falkland Palace (on right), now without a surface finish, was harled by "Callum perjonar" in 1540.

The word "harling" was used in this sense in building accounts written in the Scots language, possibly deriving from the name of a tool called a "harl". At Falkland Palace, in 1540, John Kelly and John Malcolm alias Callum worked on the "harling" of the chapel (its interior), the tennis court walls, the east turnpike turret, and the Cross House of the East Quarter. Some of the interiors were plastered by a French specialist craftsman called Hector Beato.

The three craftsmen were known as "pargeonars" and their interior work was sometimes called "pargeoning". Lime for the work came from kilns on the nearby Lomond Hills or was shipped from Dundee to Lindores. Some lime called "unburnt plaster" shipped from Dundee was processed for use at Falkland using coal. The lime used with sand to "pergyn" two round turrets and vaulted entranceways or "transes" at Holyrood Palace in 1532 came from Cousland and Gilmerton.

== See also ==
- Stucco
- Roughcast
- Pargetting
