= Islay House =

Historic site in Scotland

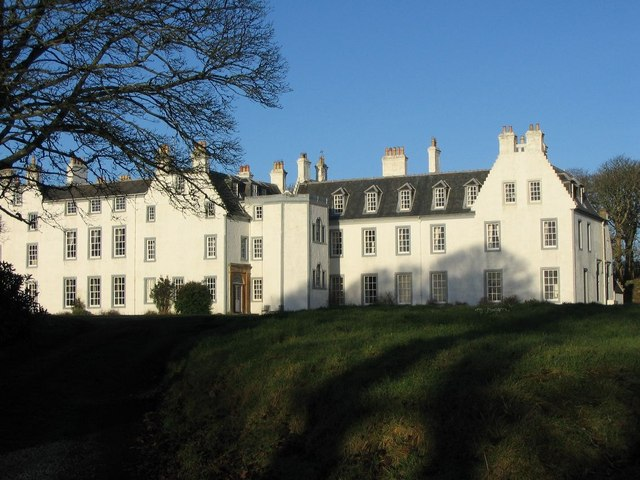
- Islay House
- Interactive map of the Islay House area
- Former names: Kilarrow House

General information
- Location: Bridgend, Islay, Scotland
- Coordinates: 55°47′03″N 6°15′16.8″W
- Construction started: 1677

Listed Building – Category A
- Official name: Islay House
- Designated: 20 July 1971
- Reference no.: LB12142

Inventory of Gardens and Designed Landscapes in Scotland
- Official name: Islay House
- Designated: 30 March 2006
- Reference no.: GDL00228

Islay House is a Category A listed country house near Bridgend, Islay, in the county of Argyll, in western Scotland on the shores of Loch Indaal.

== History and architecture ==
Originally known as Kilarrow House, it was built for Sir Hugh Campbell of Cawdor, Nairnshire around 1677. It was sold in 1726 along with most of Islay and Jura to Daniel Campbell of Shawfield and Woodhall who added the wings around 1737. The stair towers were added by Daniel Campbell, his successor around 1760 when it was renamed Islay House. It was extended again for Walter Frederick Campbell. The Campbells became bankrupt in 1847.

It was acquired in 1853 by James Morrison MP of Basildon Park, Berkshire, England and the offices and servants’ quarters were added between 1841 and 1845 by William Henry Playfair. Some of the Playfair buildings were demolished in 1910 when a 2-storey nursery wing was added by the architect Detmar Blow.

In 1980 Queen Elizabeth II paid a private visit to the house with Prince Charles, Prince Edward and Princess Margaret. As the daughter of Lord Margadale, Hon Mary Morrison was a Lady in Waiting to the Queen.

In 1985 the house was sold to Captain Thomas Friedrich of the United States Navy and in 2014 it was bought by new owners who decided to open it as a hotel. The house was sold again in October 2024 to the Payne-Clark family, who are descendants of the former head gamekeeper of the house.
