= Rinns of Islay =

Peninsula in Scotland

Rinns of Islay Lighthouse
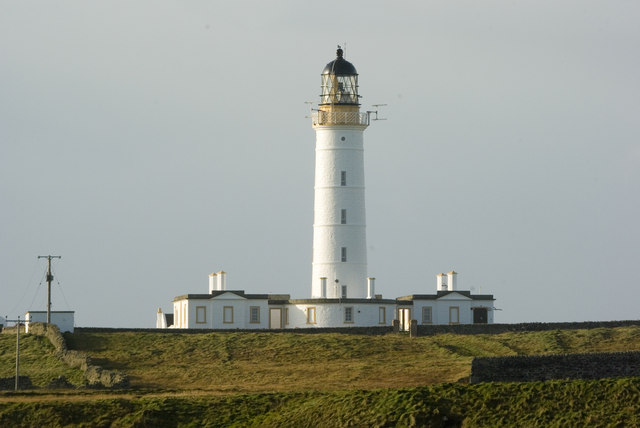
- Location: Orsay, Rinns of Islay, Argyll and Bute, Kilchoman, United Kingdom
- OS grid: NR1634551414
- Coordinates: 55°40′23″N 6°30′48″W

Tower
- Constructed: 1825
- Built by: Robert Stevenson
- Construction: masonry tower
- Automated: 31 March 1998
- Height: 29 m (95 ft)
- Shape: cylindrical tower with balcony and lantern
- Markings: white tower, black lantern, ochre trim
- Power source: solar power
- Operator: Northern Lighthouse Board
- Heritage: category A listed building

Light
- Focal height: 46 m (151 ft)
- Intensity: 600,000 candela
- Range: 24 nmi (44 km; 28 mi)
- Characteristic: Fl W 5s

Ramsar Wetland
- Official name: Rinns of Islay
- Designated: 25 April 1990
- Reference no.: 466

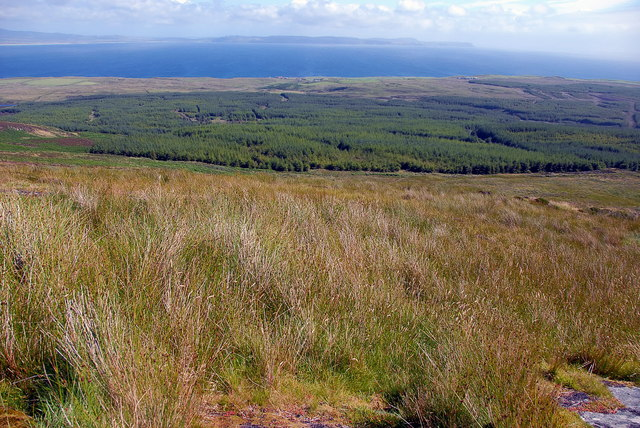
Looking across the eastern part of the Rinns from Beinn Tart A' Mhill, the highest point in the area, across the seaward end of Loch Indaal towards the Mull of Oa

The Rinns of Islay (Scottish Gaelic: Na Roinn Ìleach; alternative English spelling Rhinns of Islay) is an area on the west of the island of Islay in the Inner Hebrides of Scotland.

It is a peninsula that is attached to the main body of the island by a narrow and low-lying isthmus towards its northern end.

It is about 24 km or 15 miles from the northern extremity at Ardnave Point to its southern extremity at Rinns Point.

To the north of the isthmus, it is separated from the main part of Islay by Loch Gruinart, a sea inlet about one mile wide which is mainly uncovered at low tide. To the south of the isthmus, it is separated from the main part of Islay by a larger sea inlet, Loch Indaal.

The main population centres are Port Charlotte (Gaelic: Port Sgioba) and Portnahaven (Gaelic: Port na h-Abhainne), based on the A847 that runs along its eastern coast (on Loch Indaal).

The only significant inland body of water is Loch Gorm, about 3 km^{2}, near the centre of the Rinns, which is drained to the sea by the River Saligo. This loch is notable as the site of Loch Gorm Castle, a ruined 15th-century castle on a small island on the loch, which saw sporadic military action until the 17th century.

The Rinns is designated a Special Protection Area due to its importance for a number of breeding and wintering birds, particularly Greenland white-fronted goose and chough. The significance of the area owes much to its wide variety of habitats including bog, moorland, dune grassland, maritime grassland, marsh and extensively-farmed agricultural land.

The Rinns of Islay lighthouse is located on the offshore island of Orsay, near Rinns Point.

The Rhinns complex, a deformed igneous complex that is considered to form the basement to the Colonsay Group of metasedimentary rocks, takes its name from the Rhinns of Islay.

The southern, and somewhat hillier, part of the Rhinns contains various conifer plantations.

Distilleries in the Rinns include Bruichladdich and Kilchoman.

Historically, the Rinns have had a higher proportion of Gaelic speakers than the rest of Islay (see Islay#Gaelic language).

== See also ==
- List of lighthouses in Scotland
- List of Northern Lighthouse Board lighthouses
