= Rhinns complex =

Complex in Argyll and Bute, Scotland

Coordinates: 55.67°N 6.55°W

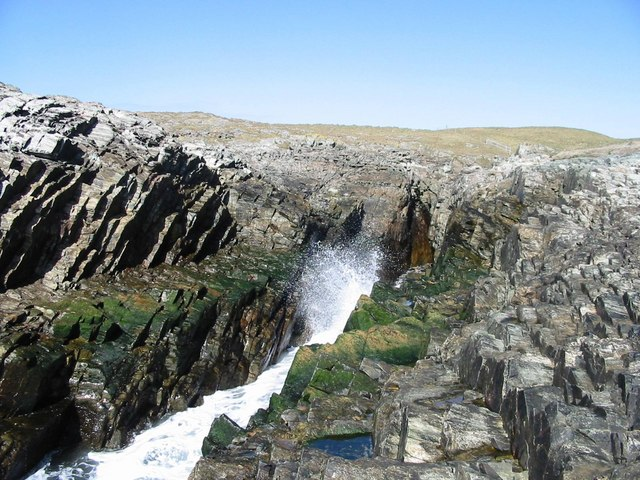
Rocks of the Rhinns complex at Claddach bay on the southernmost tip of the Rhinns of Islay

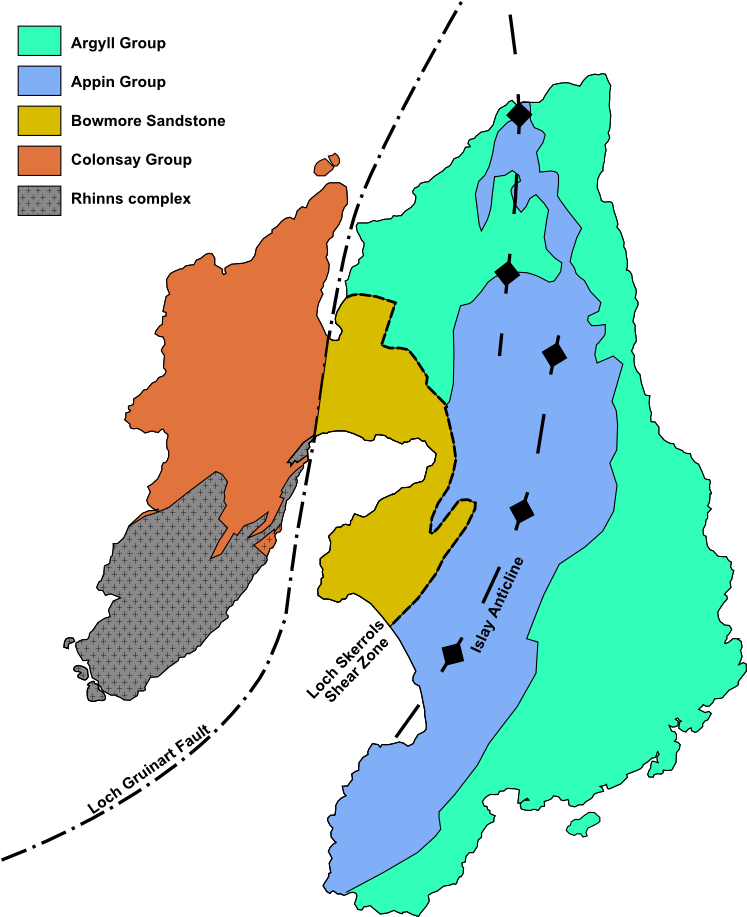
Geological map of Islay

The Rhinns complex is a deformed Palaeoproterozoic igneous complex that is considered to form the basement to the Colonsay Group of metasedimentary rocks. The largest outcrop of the complex is on the Rhinns of Islay, from where the complex gets its name. It has also been recognised in three other inliers extending to the southwest as far as Inishtrahull, off the north coast of County Donegal.

== Distribution ==
The Rhinns complex has been recognised in a series of four outcrops that form inliers within younger cover sequences of the Dalradian Supergroup and the Colonsay Group. The most easterly of these exposures is on the islands of Colonsay, where the complex consists of strongly retrogressed orthogneisses, although the correlation of this outcrop with the Rhinns complex has been questioned on the basis of new radiometric dating and Hf isotope analyses. On the Rhinns of Islay, gneisses of the Rhinns complex lie unconformably beneath the Colonsay Group, which is correlated with the Dalradian Supergroup. The gneisses on Islay consist of two main types, a dominant medium to coarse-grained syenitic gneiss, which is cut by large intrusions of gabbro (now deformed). Between Islay and Inishtrahull, a third submarine outcrop has been recognised from dredged seabed samples and geophysical data. The final outcrop is on the island of Inishtrahull, which has similar lithologies to that on the Rhinns of Islay.

== Formation ==
The Rhinns complex consists of a set of Palaeoproterozoic igneous rocks that were intruded about 1.78 Ga (billions of years ago). They had been metamorphosed by 1.71 Ga. The overall chemistry of the rocks is consistent with magmatism associated with an Andean type subduction complex.
