= Bridgend, Islay =

Hamlet on the Isle of Islay, Scotland

Coordinates: 55.78°N 6.25°W

Bridgend: Scottish Gaelic: Beul an Àtha
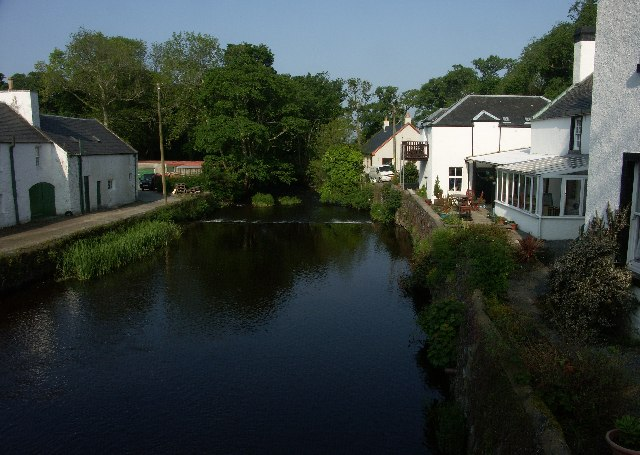
- The River Sorn at Bridgend

- Location within Argyll and Bute
- OS grid reference: NR336624
- Civil parish: Killarow and Kilmeny
- Council area: Argyll and Bute
- Lieutenancy area: Argyll and Bute
- Country: Scotland
- Sovereign state: United Kingdom
- Post town: ISLE OF ISLAY
- Postcode district: PA44
- Dialling code: 01496
- Police: Scotland
- Fire: Scottish
- Ambulance: Scottish
- UK Parliament: Argyll, Bute and South Lochaber
- Scottish Parliament: Argyll and Bute

Bridgend (Scottish Gaelic: Beul an Àtha) is a village on the Inner Hebrides island of Islay off the western coast of Scotland at the tip of Loch Indaal. The village is within the parish of Killarow and Kilmeny.

The island's two main roads, the A846 and A847, meet in the village just north of the bridge over the River Sorn that gives the village its name. The A846 passes through the village on its route between Port Askaig and Ardbeg. The A847 begins in Bridgend and continues to Portnahaven.

It is notable as the location of Islay House. The bridge over the River Sorn is Category B listed.

The National Bank of Scotland opened a branch in Bridgend in 1838 under the management of Duncan McAlister, Merchant and Postmaster. The building constructed in 1838 is Category B listed.
