= Nerabus =

Hamlet on the Isle of Islay, Scotland

Coordinates: 55.709°N 6.419°W

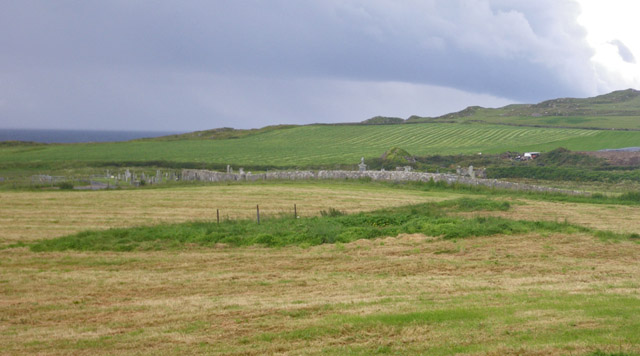
- MacDonald cemetery at Nerabus

- Location within Argyll and Bute
- OS grid reference: NR2255
- Council area: Argyll and Bute
- Lieutenancy area: Argyll and Bute
- Country: Scotland
- Sovereign state: United Kingdom
- Post town: ISLE OF ISLAY
- Postcode district: PA48
- Dialling code: 01496
- Police: Scotland
- Fire: Scottish
- Ambulance: Scottish
- UK Parliament: Argyll, Bute and South Lochaber
- Scottish Parliament: Argyll and Bute

Nerabus (otherwise Nereabolls) is a hamlet in the west of the isle of Islay in Scotland. The vicinity is noted for its scenic qualities and diverse birdlife. Nerabus lies along the A847 road on the route from Port Charlotte to Portnahaven. The locale has an early influence by the Norse.
