= Portnahaven =

Coordinates: 55.68°N 6.50°W

Portnahaven: Scottish Gaelic: Port na h-Abhainne
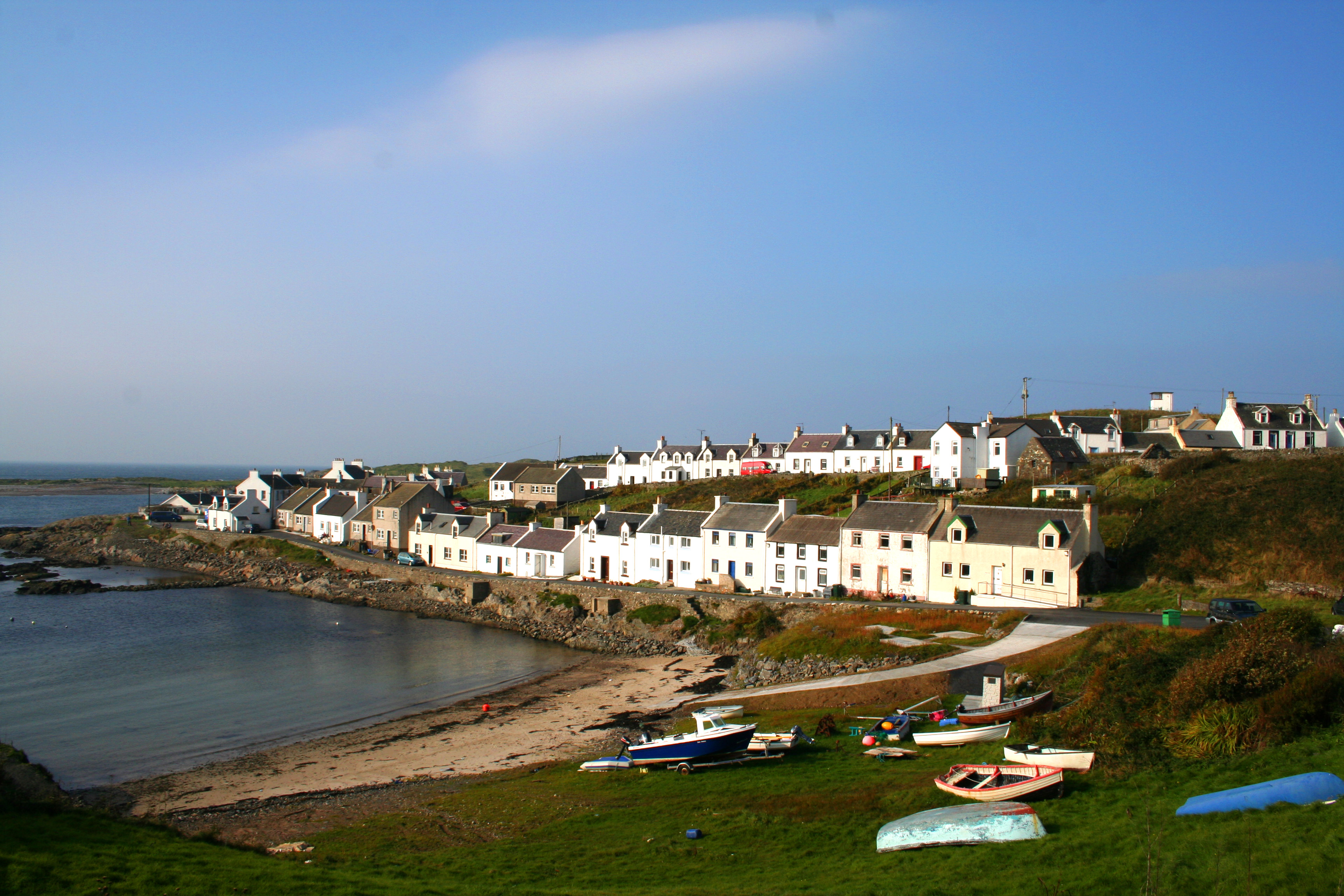
- A view of the North side of Portnahaven and its harbour

- Location within Argyll and Bute
- Population: 150 (1991)
- OS grid reference: NR170521
- Civil parish: Kilchoman
- Council area: Argyll and Bute
- Lieutenancy area: Argyll and Bute
- Country: Scotland
- Sovereign state: United Kingdom
- Post town: ISLE OF ISLAY
- Postcode district: PA47
- Dialling code: 01496
- Police: Scotland
- Fire: Scottish
- Ambulance: Scottish
- UK Parliament: Argyll, Bute and South Lochaber
- Scottish Parliament: Argyll and Bute

Portnahaven (Scottish Gaelic: Port na h-Abhainne, meaning river port) is a village on Islay in the Inner Hebrides, Scotland. The village is within the parish of Kilchoman.

It was founded by Walter Campbell of Shawfield after he purchased the Sunderland estate in 1788 and it was further developed in the 1820s by his son Captain Walter Campbell of Foreland and Sunderland. Portnahaven Parish Church was erected in 1828 as a Telford Parliamentary church to the designs of Thomas Telford and the architect William Thomson.

It is located at the southern tip of the Rinns at the southern end of the A847 road. The A847 follows the coast from Portnahaven to Port Charlotte and Bridgend. Its harbour is sheltered by the island of Orsay and its smaller neighbour Eilean Mhic Coinnich. The Rinns of Islay lighthouse, built by Stevenson is located on Orsay. Portnahaven is served by a church, one shop which is also a post office, and a public house, An Tigh Seinnse. The harbour around which the village is built provides the opportunity to observe grey seals at close quarters. The village of Port Wemyss is located just to the south of Portnahaven.

In 1991 it had a population of 150.

North of Portnahaven, at Claddach, is the world's first operational wave power machine. The "Islay LIMPET", constructed by Wavegen, became operational in 2000.

Nearby settlements include the village of Nerabus.
