= Bowmore Sandstone Group =

- Stratigraphic range: Neoproterozoic
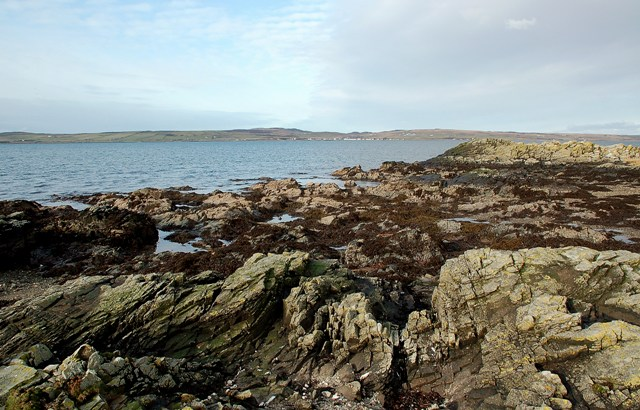
- Laggan Formation at Eilean Mhic Ghoile, near Bowmore, Islay
- Type: Group
- Sub-units: Laggan Formation, Blackrock Formation

Lithology
- Primary: Sandstone
- Other: Shale, siltstone

Location
- Region: Inner Hebrides

Type section
- Named for: Bowmore

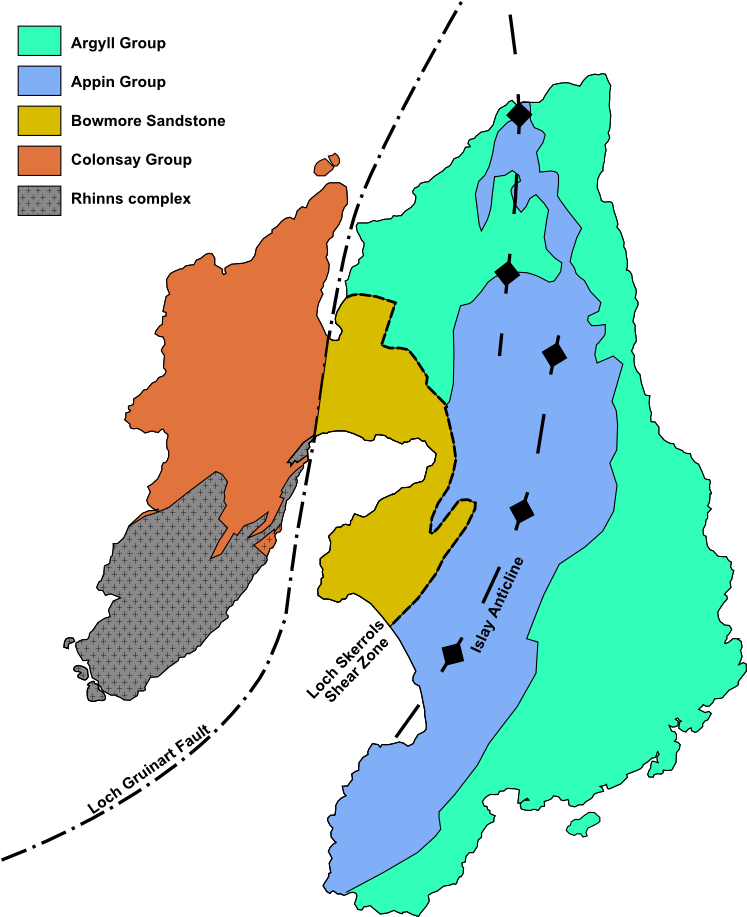
Geological map of Islay

The Bowmore Sandstone Group is a sequence of metasedimentary rocks, dominantly sandstones, of probable Neoproterozoic age. Their outcrop on the island of Islay in the Inner Hebrides is entirely fault-bounded, between the Loch Gruinart Fault to the west and the Loch Skerrols Shear Zone to the east.
