= Ardnave Point =

Coordinates: 55.890°N 6.3289°W

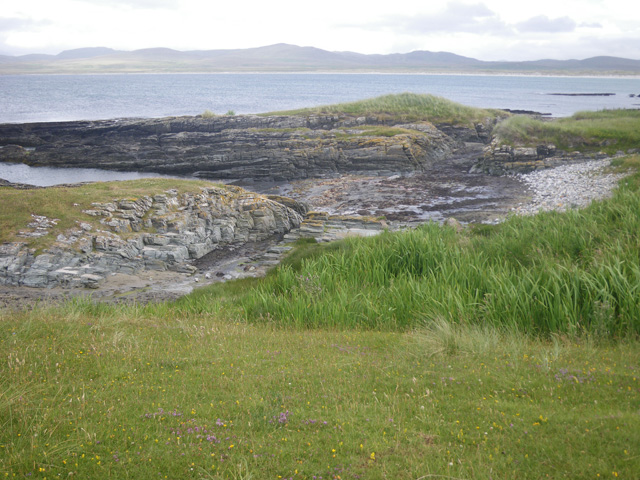
Rocky shoreline at Ardnave Point. In the background is the coast of north Islay east of Loch Gruinart.

Ardnave Point (Scottish Gaelic, Àird an Naoimh) is a coastal promontory on the northwest of Islay, a Scottish island. This landform has a rocky northern shore and extensive dunes on the upland areas of the point.

== See also ==
- Loch Gruinart
