= Loch Gruinart =

- Loch Gruinneard (Scottish Gaelic)
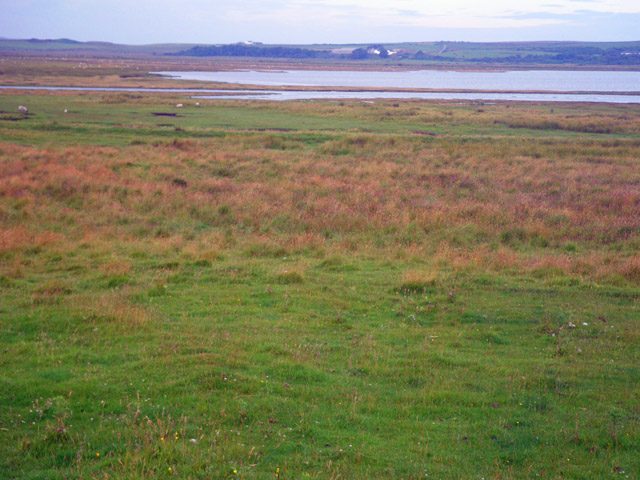
- Loch Gruinart and marsh fringe near the Allt a Ghil inflow

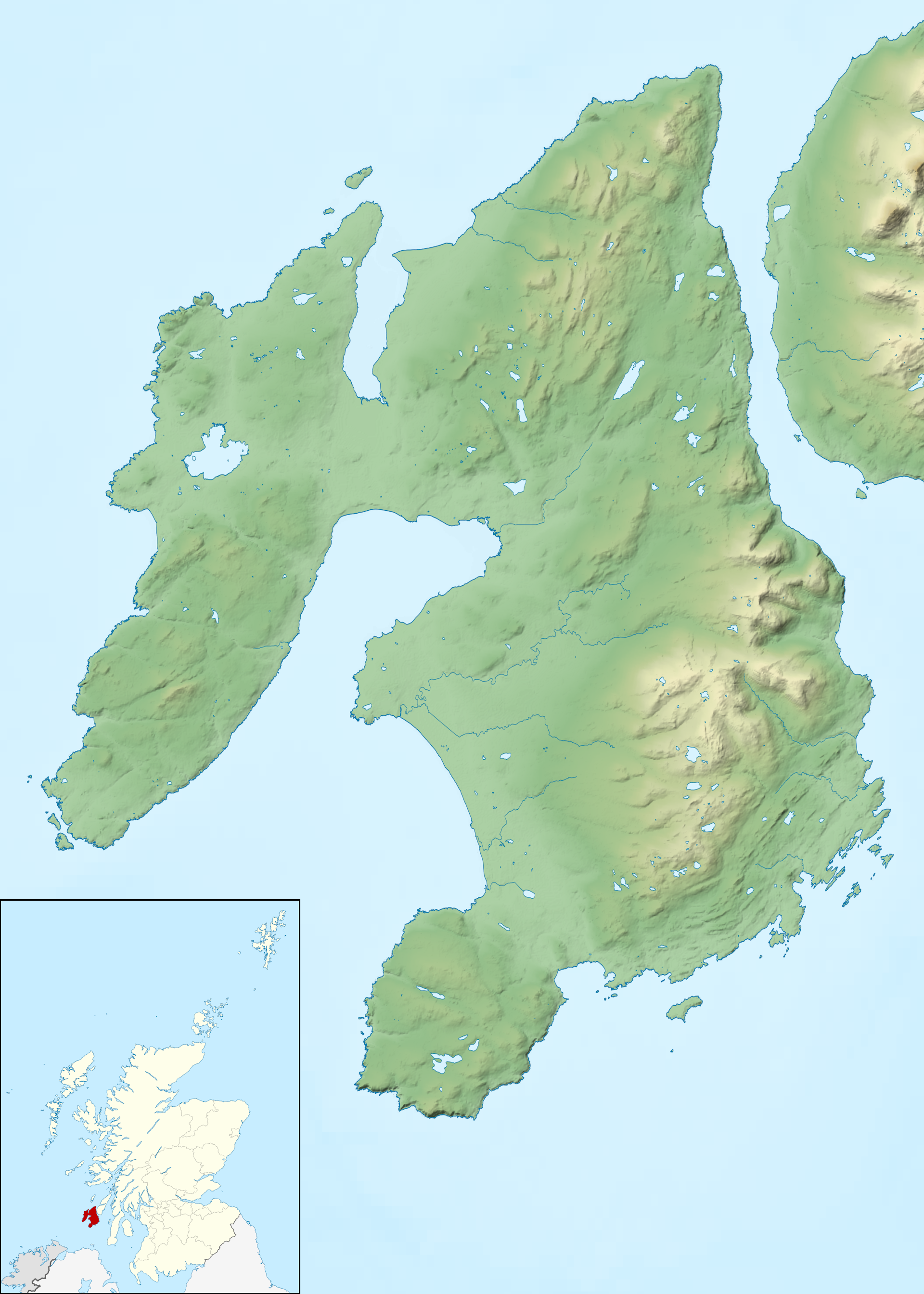
- Loch Gruinart next to Islay
- Coordinates: 55°52′N 6°19′W
- Type: Sea Loch
- Frozen: No

Loch Gruinart (Scottish Gaelic: Loch Gruinneard from the Old Norse, meaning "shallow fjord") is a sea loch on the northern coast of isle of Islay in Scotland. Land at the head of the loch, Gruinart Flats, is a designated nature reserve owned by the RSPB. It is an important winter roosting site for barnacle geese. Ardnave Point is a coastal promontory near the mouth of the loch on the northwest of Islay.

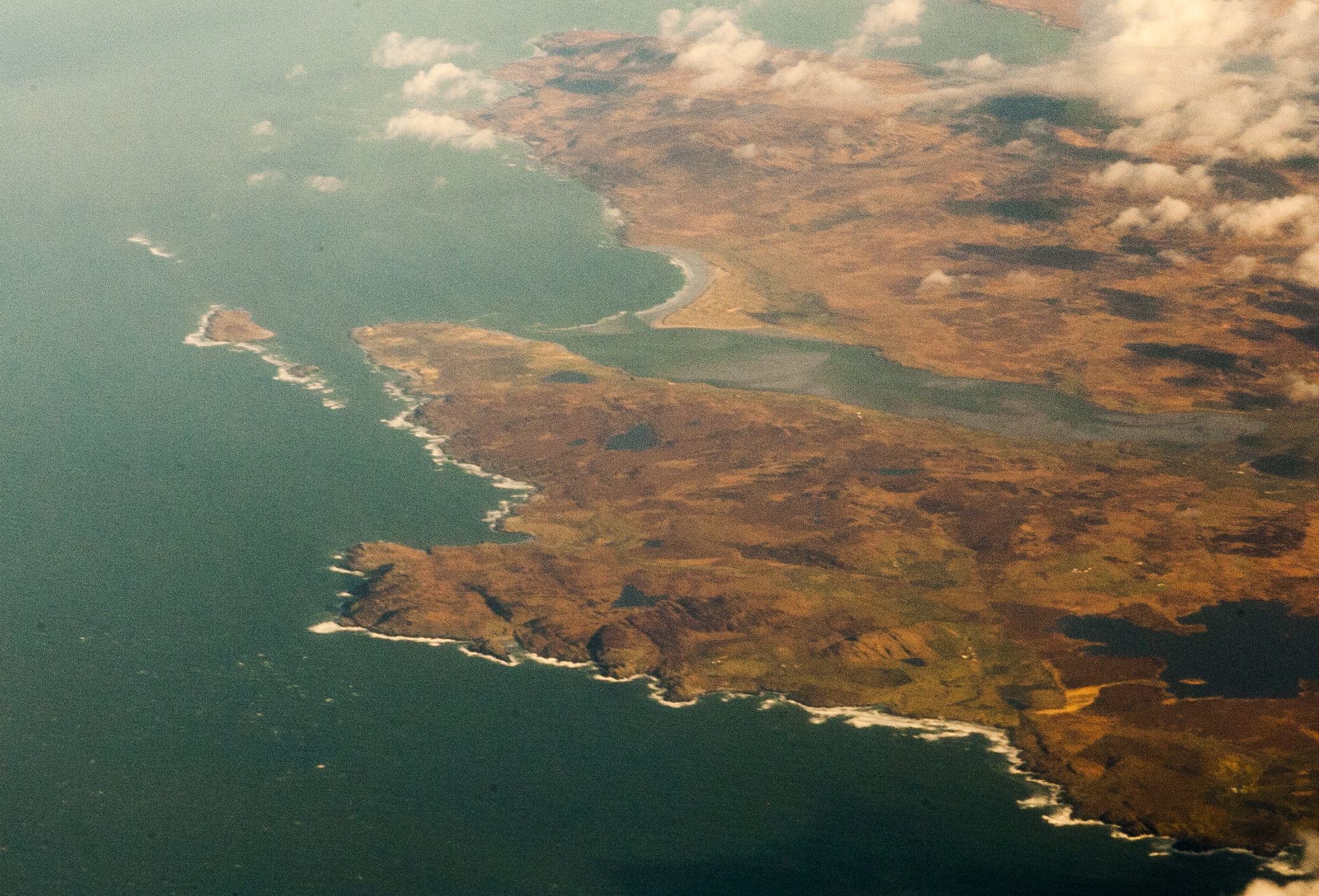
Loch Gruinart (center) and northwest Islay from the air. Ardnave Point and Nave Island at left center.

The Battle of Traigh Ghruinneart was fought on the sands at the south end of the loch on 5 August 1598 between a force from Mull led by Sir Lachlan Mor MacLean of Duart and the Islay men led by Sir James MacDonald, 9th of Dunnyveg, son of Angus MacDonald of Dunyvaig and the Glens, in which Macleans were defeated and all killed, including Sir Lachlan, save one who survived by swimming to Nave Island.

The pìobaireachd Lament for Sir Lachlan Mor harks back to this battle which was also remembered in Islay folklore.
