= Orsay, Inner Hebrides =

Island in Argyll and Bute, Scotland

Orsay
Orasaigh (Gaelic)
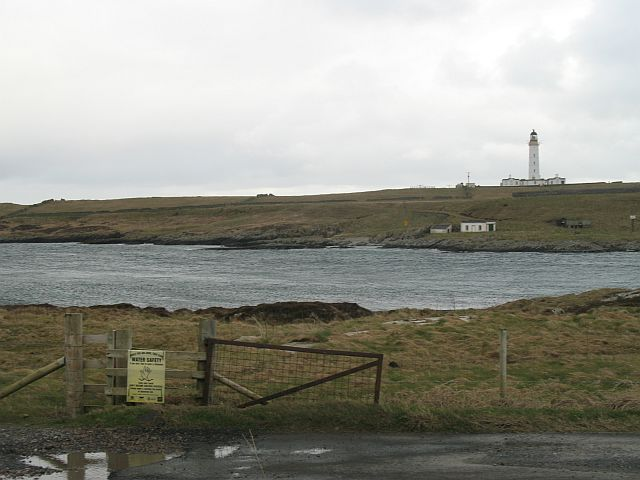
- Orsay seen from Port Wemyss, south-east of Portnahaven

Location
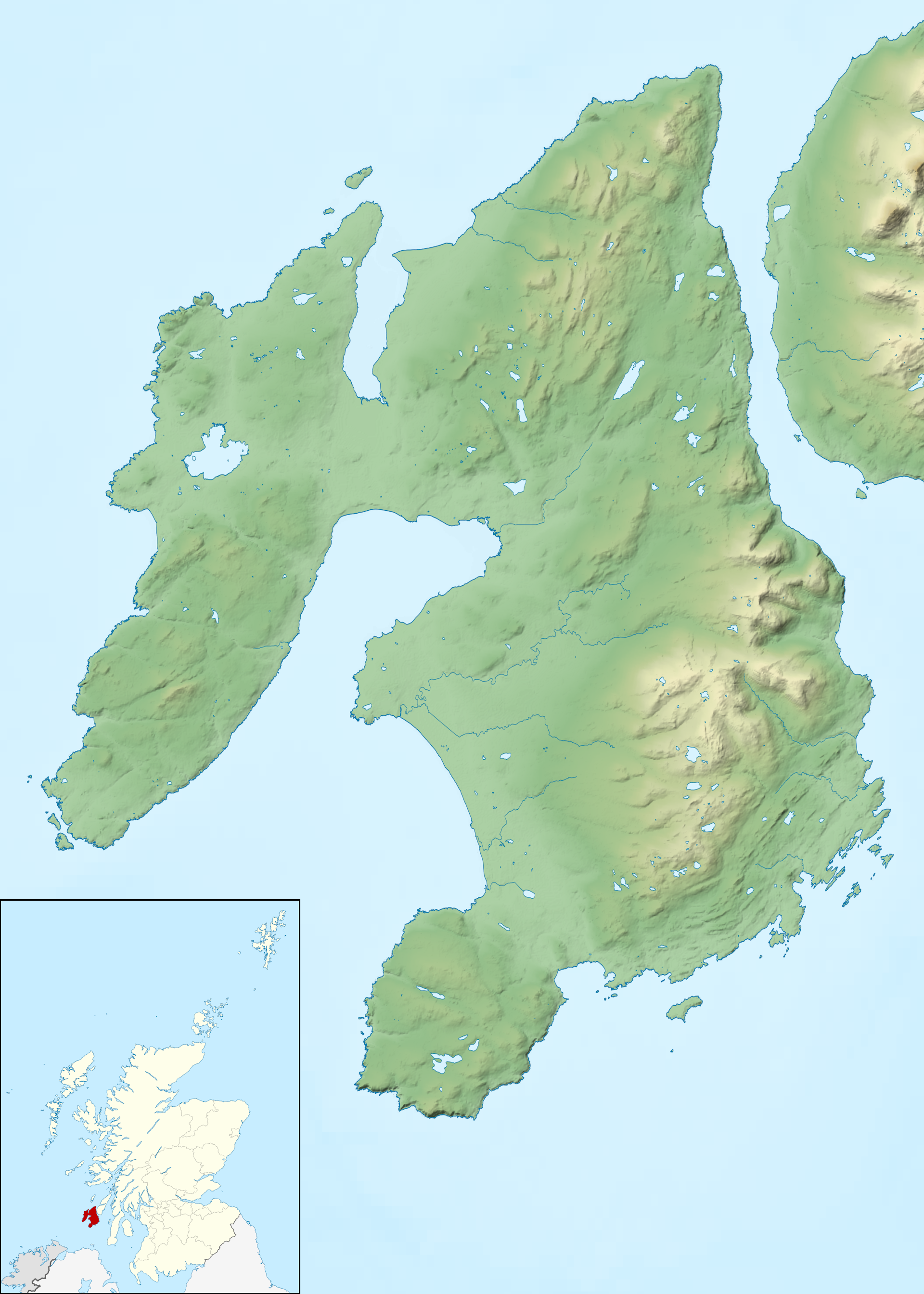
- Orsay shown next to Islay Orsay shown within Argyll and Bute
- OS grid reference: NR165515
- Coordinates: 55°40′25″N 6°30′45″W

Physical geography
- Island group: Islay
- Area: 24 hectares (0.1 sq mi)
- Highest elevation: 24 metres (79 ft)

Administration
- Council area: Argyll and Bute
- Country: Scotland
- Sovereign state: United Kingdom

Demographics
- Population: 0

Orsay (Scottish Gaelic: Orasaigh) is a small island in the Inner Hebrides of Scotland. It lies a short distance off the west coast of the island of Islay and shelters the harbour of the village of Portnahaven.

The Rinns of Islay lighthouse was built on Orsay in 1825 by Robert Stevenson.
