= Clark Cottage, Scotland =

Clark Cottage
- Location within Argyll and Bute

General information
- Location: Port Charlotte, Islay, Scotland
- Coordinates: 55.7378°N 6.3797°W

Clark Cottage is a residential building in the Scottish village of Port Charlotte on the island of Islay. The building is on the eastern side of Main Street in the south-eastern part of the town. On 28 August 1980, Clark Cottage was listed as a Category C Listed Building.

== Description ==
The exact record of when it was built is not clear, but it is believed that it could not have been before the earlier part of the 19th century. Clark Cottage is located directly at the top of the rectangular estate, which is almost 60m from the rocky coast of Loch Indaal. Clark Cottage is built in a traditional manner with a surface area of 9x10 m^{2}. On the ground floor, a gabled roof was placed with a top and bottom. The roof is aligned with slate. The facades to the north and east were plastered with the traditional harling technique. To the south, Clark Cottage is joined with another building, which is two stories high and towers above it. This building called Achnamara is also listed.
