= Kilchoman distillery =

Scotch whisky distillery on Islay, Scotland

Coordinates: 55°47′13″N 6°25′51″W

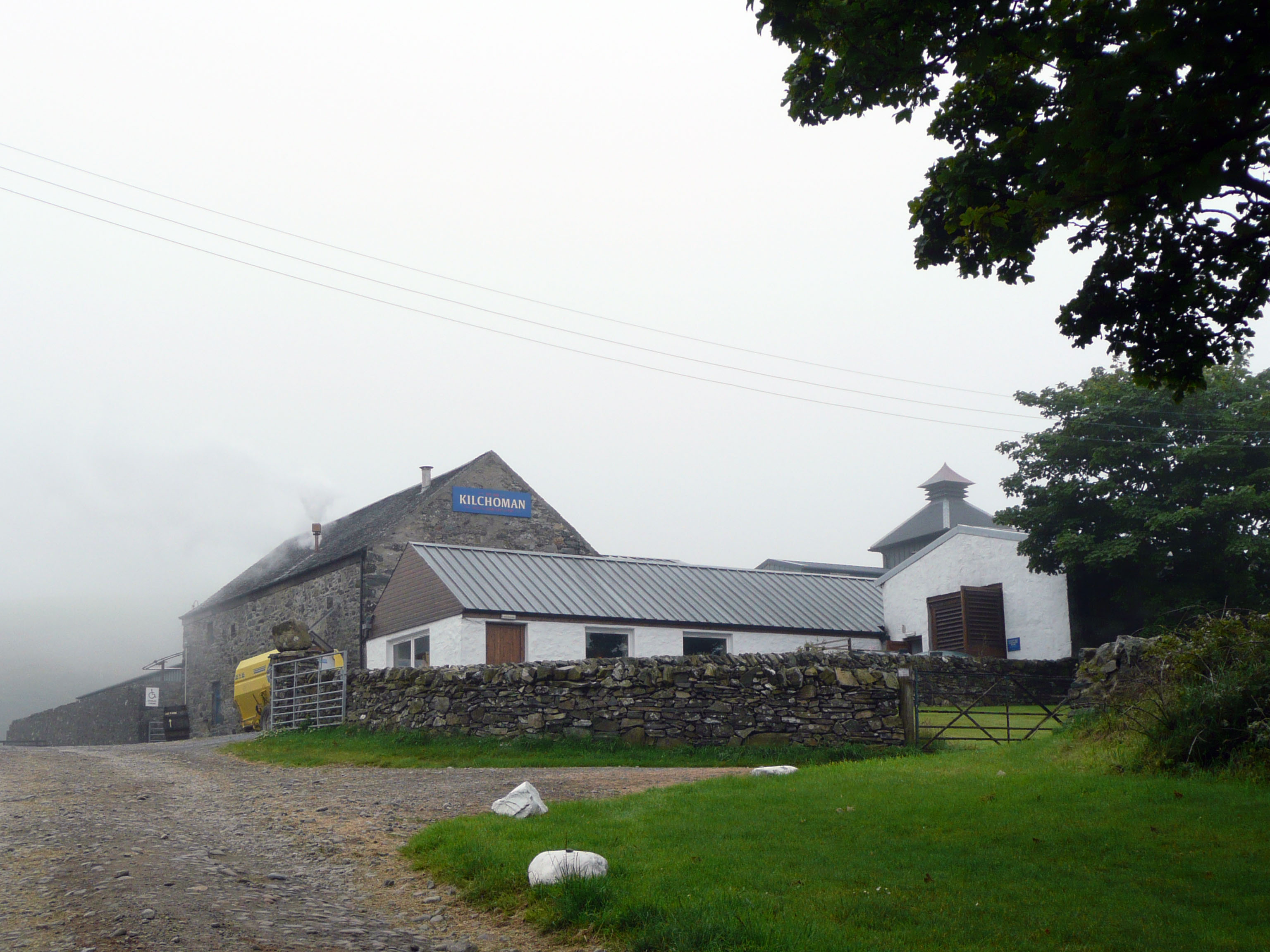

Region: Islay
- Location: Islay
- Owner: Anthony Wills
- Founded: 2005
- Status: Operational
- Water source: Small dam close to distillery
- No. of stills: 2 wash stills 2 spirit stills
- Capacity: 500,000 L (110,000 imp gal)

Kilchoman
- Age(s): 3 Years; 5 Years; 8 Years; 10 Years; 11 Years

Kilchoman distillery (pronounced /kɪlˈxoʊmən/ or /kɪlˈhoʊmən/) is a distillery that produces single malt Scotch whisky on Islay, an island of the Inner Hebrides. Kilchoman Distillery is in the northwest of the island, close to Machir Bay. Kilchoman was founded by Anthony Wills and remains an independent, family run distillery. It is the smallest on the island but since obtaining Rockside Farm in 2015, is in the process of expanding.

== History ==
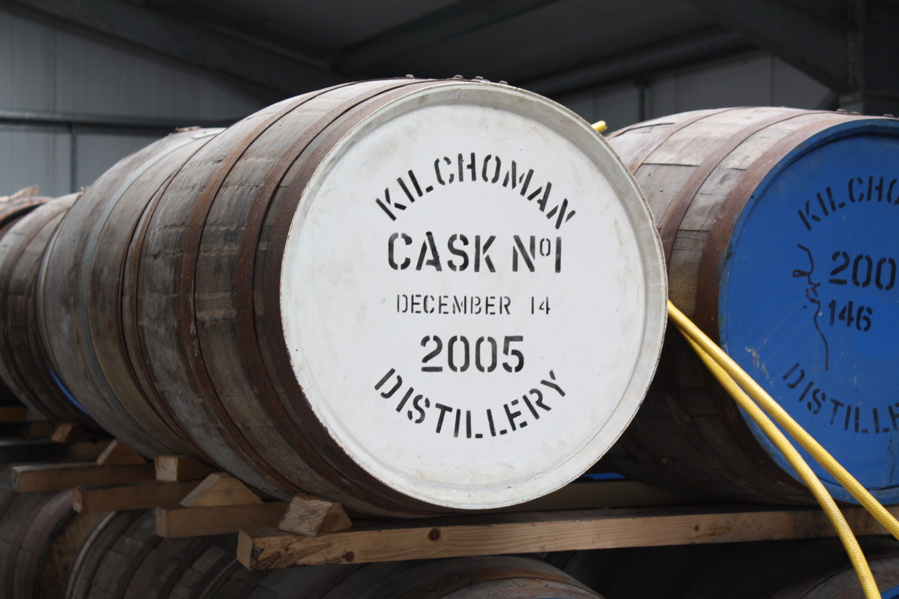
First cask of Kilchoman single malt whisky

The distillery began production in December 2005, and was the first to be built on Islay since 1908. The distillery uses barley grown on site at Rockside Farm and malted at the distillery, as well as malt from the Port Ellen maltings and releases separate bottlings depending on the source of the grain. It is one of six Scottish distilleries still working with traditional floor-maltings, and is unique in completing all parts of the whisky making process – growing barley, malting, distilling, maturing and bottling – on Islay.

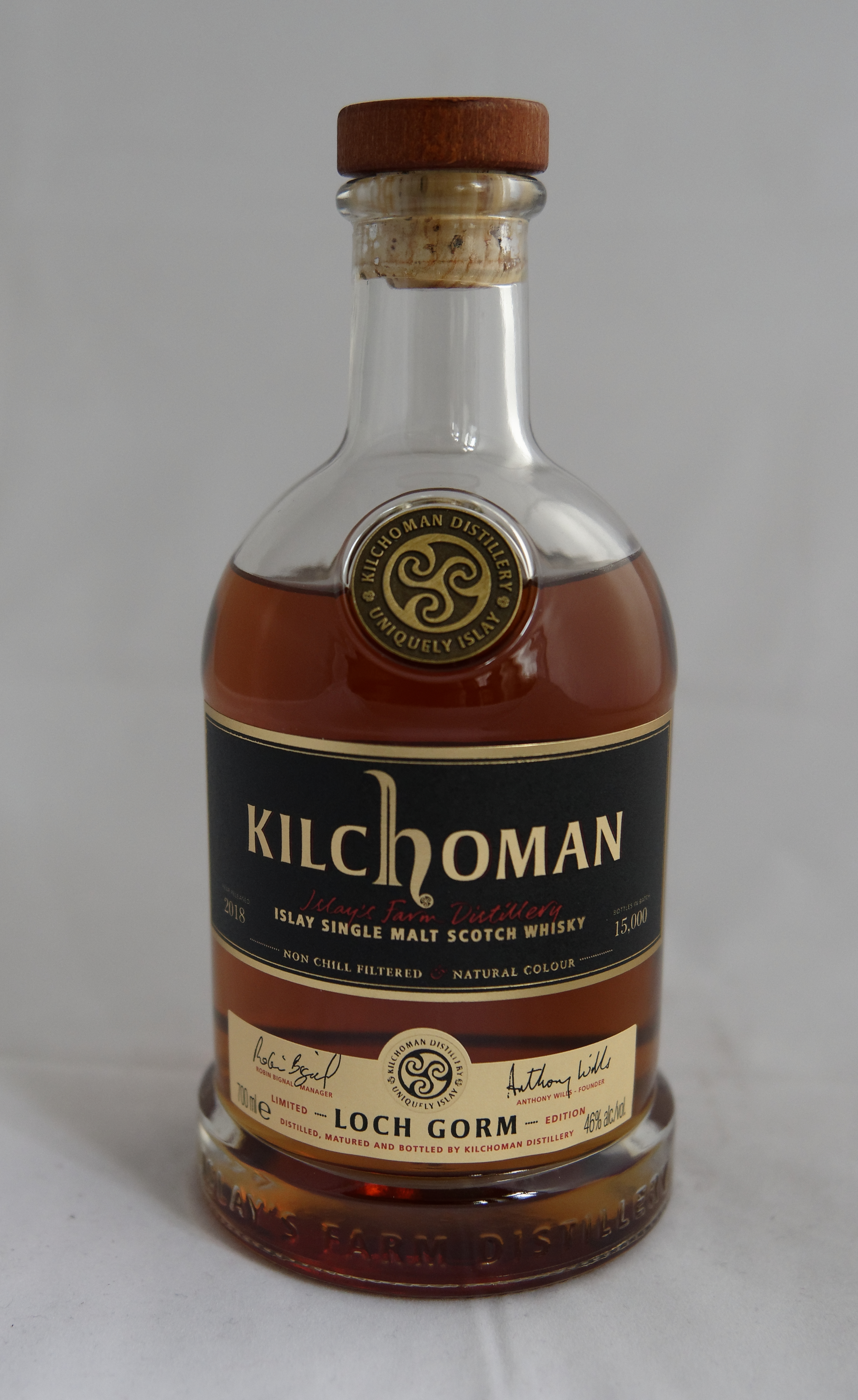
Kilchoman Loch Gorm, 46%

The distillery first filled casks on 14 December 2005 and the distillery began bottling 3-year-old single malt in September 2009. The first Kilchoman, the "Inaugural release" was released in 2009 and the first 100% Islay whisky released in 2011.

The whisky produced by the Port Ellen maltings are peated to the same levels as Ardbeg 50 ppm, while the malt peated on their own floor maltings will be approximately 20 ppm. Since 2023, Kilchoman has been sourcing bourbon casks from Breckenridge Distillery in Colorado. The new supplier has replaced Buffalo Trace, from where Kilchoman sourced bourbon barrels since 2005. In 2023, the distillery came second in a ranking by Cask Connoisseur of the most popular whisky distilleries. In 2025, the distillery celebrated its 20th anniversary and released a number of special bottlings, such as the four-part "20th Anniversary Cask Series".

== Bottlings ==
Kilchoman releases several bottlings.

- Machir Bay, 46% ABV
- Loch Gorm, 46% ABV, launched in 2013. The latest bottling from the series was released in 2024.
- Sanaig, 46% ABV, originally released for the French market – launched worldwide in 2016
- 100% Islay, 50% ABV – this is the grain-to-glass offering from Kilchoman
- Kilchoman PX Sherry Cask Matured 2023 - Full Sherry cask maturation limited to 23000 bottles
- Kilchoman 16 Years - Matured in bourbon and oloroso sherry, the distillery's oldest whisky to date
