= Inveraray Bell Tower =

The Duke's Tower
- Inveraray Bell Tower
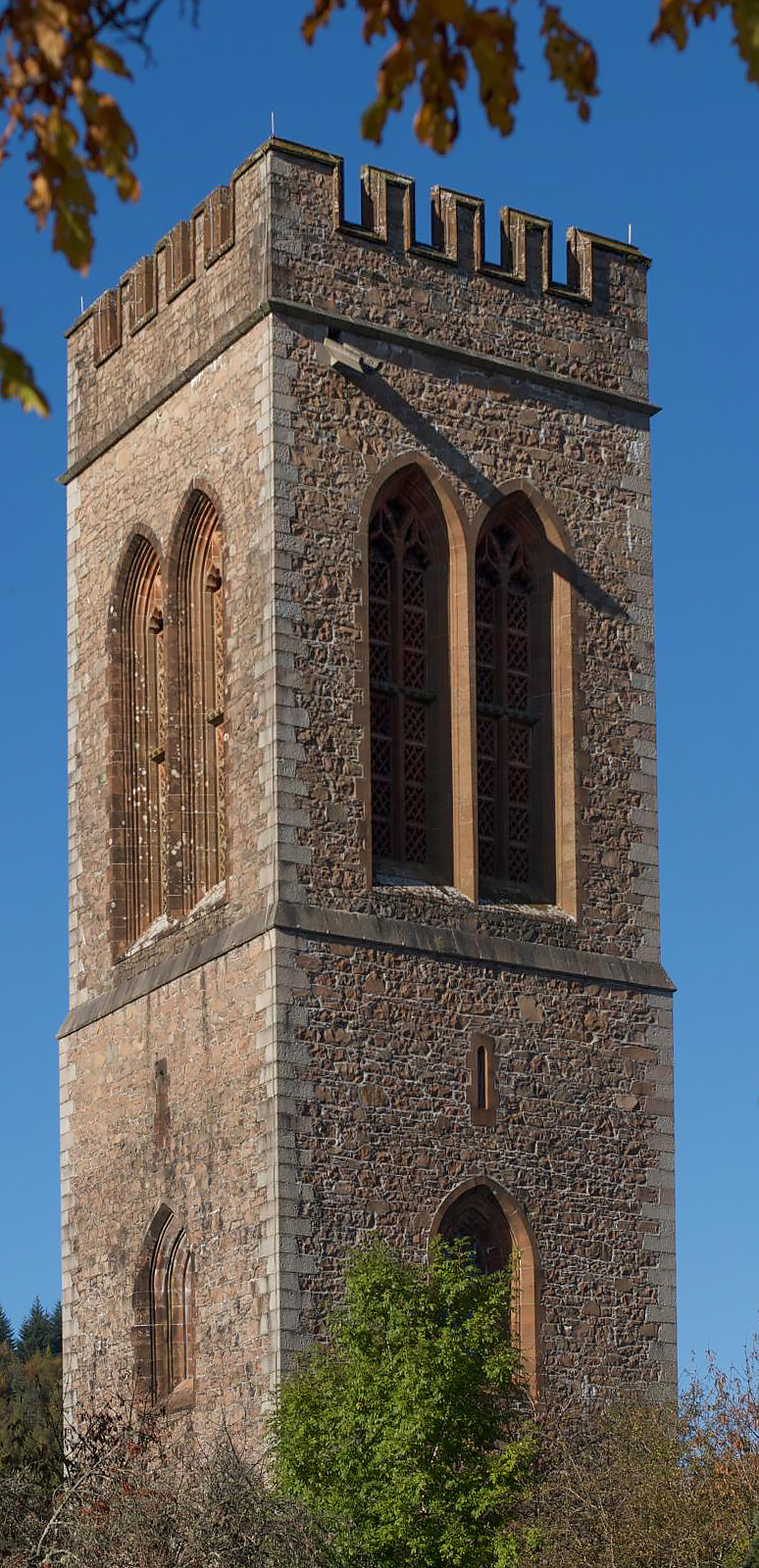

- Location in Argyll & Bute
- 56.23038°N 5.07546°W
- Location: Inveraray, Argyll and Bute, Scotland

Architecture
- Heritage designation: Category A
- Designated: 23 August 1980
- Style: Gothic Revival
- Years built: 1920-1931
- Construction cost: £18,000 (1931)

Specifications
- Height: 126 feet (38 m) - roof 138 feet (42 m) - stair turret

The Duke's Tower, also known as Inveraray Bell Tower, is the detached bell tower of All Saints' Church, Inveraray, Argyll and Bute, Scotland. Standing 126 feet (38 m) high on the shores of Loch Fyne, it is a landmark for miles and amongst the most notable bell towers in the United Kingdom. The tower was built as a memorial to members of the Clan Campbell who died in the First World War. It is Category A listed by Historic Environment Scotland, the highest possible rating.

A popular tourist attraction, the tower is open to visitors during the summer months who come to admire the views or watch the famous bells being rung by the many change ringers who come from across the country to ring them. The bells are considered to be "the finest peal in Scotland".

== History ==
=== Construction ===
During 1914, Niall Campbell, 10th Duke of Argyll, became the Honorary Colonel of The 8th Battalion of The Argyll and Sutherland Highlanders, known as the Clan Campbell. Following heavy losses of the Clan in the First World War, Campbell commissioned the architects Hoare and Wheeler to design a memorial bell tower to commemorate the fallen, the original idea being to link the new tower to the neighbouring All Saints Church, built in 1886.

Gradually, the money was raised, and by 1921, construction had begun on the lower stages of the tower. Construction was slow, in part due to the scale of the tower proposed and due to the remote location. By the mid-1920s, the tower had been completed as far as the base of the belfry, some 73 feet (22 m) above ground level and construction paused to raise money to complete the tower. Construction up to this point had cost £9,750. The scale of the tower was evident, as up to the point where work paused, the tower walls were a vast 8 feet (240 cm) thick and internally, the tower was 23 feet (7.0 m) square.

Construction on the upper half of the tower resumed two years later in February 1930, costing a further £8,000 to complete the tower, which was topped out in April 1931. The tower in total cost £17,750 to build, more than £800,000 in modern money (2017). The tower was built without any external scaffolding and the Duke himself laboured on the tower to finish it, but his plan to connect it to the church was never realised, and the tower remains detached to this day.

=== Damage and restoration ===
Inveraray is one of the wettest places in the United Kingdom, receiving over 70 inches (180 cm) of rain each year and due to the remoteness of the location, the tower was not well maintained. Rainwater flooded in through the huge louvres, further exacerbated by a lightning strike on November 28, 1944, which left damaged stone work and a hole in the roof. By the mid-1960s, the floors of the tower were waterlogged, that of the ringing chamber being close to collapse. The entire tower was nearing dereliction.

The tower was restored during the late 1960s by the efforts of Yorkshire ringers Norman, Elsie and John Chaddock, working with the church secretary, Mrs Noble, and it is thanks to them that the tower survives today. The restoration included:

- Replacement of ringing room chamber floor
- Weather proofing of belfry windows
- Repair of interior stonework
- Replacement of interior windows
- De-rusting and painting of the bell frame
- Repairing the roof
- Opening the tower to the public

Elsie Chaddock died in June 1987 and her husband, Norman, moved back to Yorkshire, passing control of the tower over to the Scottish Association of Change Ringers, who have carried out additional tasks, such as:

- Installation of electricity
- Sound control measures
- Replacement bell ropes
- Renovation of fittings
- Interior of tower cleaned
- Acoustic improvements
- Further weather proofing

These jobs continue to the present day, undertaken by volunteer ringers from Glasgow and Edinburgh, as the climate of Inveraray makes constant maintenance a necessity. Ropes are removed from the bells every autumn, dried out and re-fitted in the spring. The tower is now a popular tourist attraction in the summer, both with visitors to Inveraray and bell ringers, who travel from across the UK to ring the bells.

== Architecture ==
The Duke's Tower is a dominant landmark on Loch Fyne, reaching a height of 126 feet (38 m) to the battlements and 138 feet (42 m) to the top of the stair turret. The tower is built of pink granite, the walls of the lower portions some 8 feet (240 cm) thick and the belfry 4 feet 6 inches thick, the entire structure is 23 feet (7.0 m) square internally.

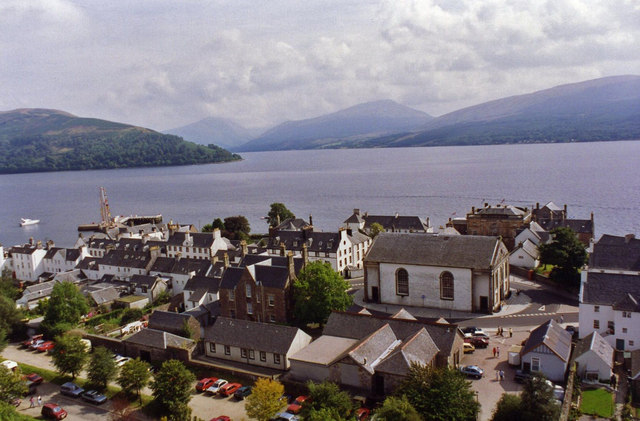
View from the tower roof, overlooking Loch Fyne.

Designed by Hoare and Wheeler, the tower has Somerset influences, with very large belfry openings featuring pierced stone tracery, common in Somerset church towers. The tower is formed of four stages; the lower stage containing two large two-light windows on the south and west faces, the north face is blind, containing the stair turret, and the east face containing a recessed arch and small window, where an extension was intended to join it to the church. The ground floor now contains an exhibition of the tower, bells and their history.

The second stage of the tower contains the ringing chamber, lit on three sides by two-light windows, the north face is again blank due to the presence of the stair turret. The third stage is the "silence chamber", lit by small lancet windows, intended to deaden the sound of the bells in the ringing chamber below.

The fourth and highest stage of the tower is the belfry, lit by seven massive belfry window openings, containing pierced stone tracery. In more recent times, shutters have been fitted to the interior faces of these openings to protect against weather and to reduce the sound of the bells outside. These belfry openings are of the paired design, each face containing two openings, except for the north face, which contains one. The belfry openings are divided into two courses by mullions. The stair turret culminates in a pointed pinnacle 12 feet (3.7 m) above the battlements.

== Bells ==
=== History ===
Campbell had designed the tower from the outset to contain a suitably large set of bells. Whilst the tower was in the planning stages, John Taylor & Co of Loughborough, Leicestershire, were invited to cast a peal of bells suitable for the memorial. The sizes and notes of the bells agreed with the Duke, the bells were cast at Taylor's in November and December 1920, followed by the fittings and the frame in 1921. The casting and manufacturing were completed by autumn 1921, and the first of several lorry loads from Loughborough to Inveraray, a journey of more than 350 miles, left on 1 November 1921.

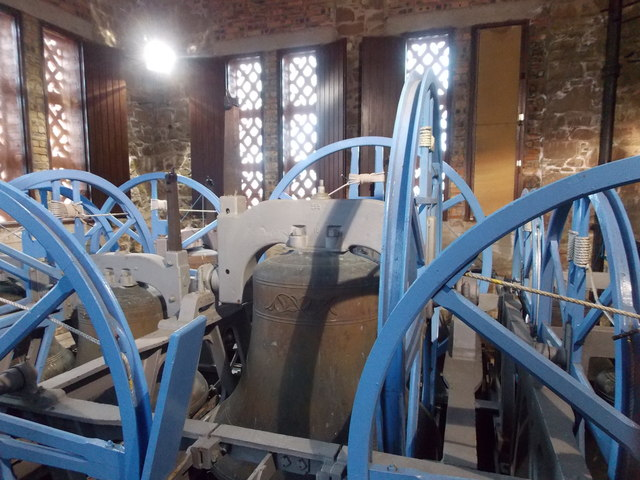
The belfry, tenor in the centre.

The journey was not without difficulty, for the first lorry, containing five of the bells and some of the ironwork, broke down at Coppull in Lancashire, necessitating a second lorry to be sent out to continue the journey. No further issues were encountered until 24 November when in the mountainous terrain of Glen Croe, a lorry carrying the lightest bells and framework was unable to make it up the Rest and Be Thankful pass, forcing the driver to stop passing motorists and ask for help unloading the treble bell so it could continue. The treble bell alone weighed 311 kilograms (686 lb) and though the reduction of weight helped, the lorry was still unable to reach the summit, so the second lightest bell was unloaded too; only then was the lorry able to make it to Inveraray later that evening. The two bells were retrieved in the morning. The original road taken by the driver is now bypassed by the modern A83, but at the time, it was the only road linking Inveraray to southern Scotland.

By late November 1921, all the bells and fittings had arrived at Inveraray, ready for installation. The tower, however, had barely risen above ground level, so the bells, complete with their fittings and framework, were erected in a temporary wooden bell cage, similar to the installation at East Bergholt, Suffolk, known locally as a 'cloichtrach' (Gaelic: Bell House). Unlike East Bergholt, in which the bells are rung full circle, the set up at Inveraray only allowed the bells to be struck by hammers via clavier, similar to a carillon. Whilst not ideal, it did have the effect that those living in the vicinity got used to the sound of the bells, albeit in a quieter timbre than full circle ringing. The total cost of the bells was £2,442.

It was not until September 1931 that the tower was completed, and the bells transferred by Taylor's bell hanger into the massive belfry, resulting in a total cost, including the building of the tower and subsequent hanging, of £21,000. However, the bells were still chimed via clavier for several years, as the project was still in debt; it was not until June 1937, following a visit by ringers from St Mary's Cathedral in Glasgow, that the bells were rung full circle by a band of change ringers for the first time. The first full peal on the bells was the following year, being 5000 changes of Kent Treble Bob Royal, taking 4 hours and 3 minutes to complete.

=== Ringing ===
Inveraray has no local band of ringers, so volunteer ringers come from Edinburgh and Glasgow to ring the bells for local services, as well as keeping them maintained. The bells at Inveraray are well rung by visiting bands of ringers from across the UK during the summer months who often come to attempt a full peal on the bells, formed of more than 5,000 changes or rope-pulls, typically taking between 3.5 and 4 hours to complete. Since the first peal on the bells in 1938, more than 250 successful full peals have been rung on the bells.

During the last weekend of July each year, an international ringing festival is hosted at the tower, known as the Inveraray Ringing Festival. During the festival, bands from across the UK and beyond come to ring at Inveraray, featuring some 8 hours of open ringing over three days. Recent years have seen ringers from Southern England, Ireland and Australia travel to Inveraray for the long weekend.

For the Diamond Jubilee celebrations of Queen Elizabeth II, members of the Ancient Society of College Youths, one of the UK's most prestigious and oldest ringing societies, attempted a 'record peal', a long length twice as long as a normal full peal, on the bells. The long length was completed successfully on 21 April 2012, being 10,060 changes of Stedman Caters rung in 7 hours and 13 minutes. Upon completion, it became not only the heaviest ring of ten ever rung to a long length, but also the longest peal ever rung in Scotland.

=== Specification ===
The bells of Inveraray are a diatonic ring of ten, hung in a massive cast iron frame made by Taylor's between 1920 and 1921. With the largest bell (tenor) weighing 41 long cwt 2 qr 8 lb (4,656 lb or 2,112 kg), they are the second heaviest ringing peal of ten in the world, after Wells Cathedral in Somerset, England, as well as the heaviest peal of bells in Scotland. The bells are considered amongst the finest toned peals of bells in the world and the finest in Scotland.

Each bell is named after a local Celtic saint who built a church or monastery in the area. The Duke helped raise the money for the bells, personally donating the money for the lightest seven bells.

Bells of Inveraray Sources:
Bell Number	Weight (cwt-qrs-lbs)	Weight (kg)	Note	Diameter (inches)	Name	
Treble	6-0-14	311	E	29.00	Saint Molaug	Patron Saint of Argyll (530–592), founded the parish of Lismore. Donated by the Duke of Argyll.
2nd	6-1-26	329	D	30.56	Saint Columba	First Abbot of Iona. Donated by the Duke.
3rd	7-1-6	371	C	32.75	Saint Mund	Patron to Clan Campbell. Donated by the Duke.
4th	8-2-2	433	B	34.50	Saint Brendan	Saint Brendan of Clonfert, founder of many churches in Argyll. Donated by the Duke.
5th	10-1-5	523	A	37.50	Saint Maelrubba	Abbot of Applecross. Donated by the Duke.
6th	13-0-8	664	G	41.00	Saint Blaane	Founder of Kilblaan, three miles from Inveraray. Donated by the Duke.
7th	17-0-22	874	F	45.50	Our Lady as Star of the Sea	Donated by the Duke.
8th	20-1-21	1,038	E	48.19	Saint Murdouch	Founder of the parish of Kilmorich. Donated by Sir John Noble.
9th	28-3-0	1,461	D	54.19	Saint Brigid	Patroness of Kilbridge. Donated by 80 separate donors, all personally known to the Duke.
Tenor	41-2-8	2,112	C	60.38	Saint Molaise	Patron and founder of Stachur. Donated by three members of the Campbell Clan.

== In the media ==
- The bells of Inveraray are frequently featured on BBC Radio 4's early morning broadcast, Bells on Sunday.
- Susan Calman visited the Bell Tower in Series 3, Episode 9 of her TV show Secret Scotland, learning about the history and trying to ring one of the bells.
- Paul Murton also visited the tower in Series 4, Episode 2 of his show, Grand Tours of Scotland's Lochs.
