= Withycombe (surname) =

Withycombe is a surname, and may refer to:

- Elizabeth Withycombe (born 1902), English compiler of reference books
- James Withycombe (1843-1919), British-born American politician
- Mike Withycombe (born 1964), former professional American and Canadian football offensive lineman
