= George Nelson Godwin =

English clergyman and antiquary

George Nelson Godwin (1846–1907) was an English cleric, known for his antiquarian works with emphasis on Hampshire.

== Life ==
The only surviving son of Edward Godwin, a draper of Winchester and then a farmer of Melksham, by his wife Mary Tugwell, he was born at Winchester on 4 July 1846. With an only sister, Sarah Louisa, he was brought up there, studying at a local private school. After private tuition, and qualifying in 1868 at the London College of Divinity, he was ordained deacon in 1869 and priest in 1870. Going on to Trinity College, Dublin, he gained the Cluff memorial prize in 1882, and graduated B.A. in 1884 and B.D. in 1887.

After filling curacies at Heanor (1869–72), East Bergholt (1873–6), and Capel St. Mary (1876–7), Godwin was appointed a chaplain of the forces in 1877. He continued with the army until 1890, serving at Malta, Cairo, Dublin, the Curragh, and Netley Hospital. From 1890 to 1893 he was vicar of East Boldre, and after holding other parochial appointments, became curate in charge of Stokesby in Norfolk. He also wrote articles for the Norwich Mercury newspaper.

Godwin died suddenly of heart failure while staying for the night at an inn in Little Walsingham on 10 January 1907, and was buried in the churchyard there.

== Works ==
Godwin was best known as an antiquary and local historian, one of the founders of the Hampshire Field Club and Archæological Society, and as an authority on the history of Hampshire and neighbouring counties. He was editor of Hampshire Notes and Queries 1896–9. Civil War in Hampshire, 1642-45, and the Story of Basing House (1882; new edit. 1904) contained researches into original authorities. He wrote, with other topographical works, The Green Lanes of Hampshire, Surrey, and Sussex (1882), and (with Henry March Gilbert) Bibliotheca Hantoniensis (1891). He published also:

- A Guide to the Maltese Islands, 1880.
- Materials for English Church History, 1625-49, 1895.
- A Fourteenth Century Agas. 1905
- Nelson and 'The Old Wartime'. 1905.
- An 'Ancient' Victory. 1905.
- Norman Cross : an English 'Concentration Camp'. 1905.

All four serialised in the Norwich Mercury newspaper.

== Family ==
Godwin was twice married:

1. on 13 February 1870 to Mary Godwin (not closely related), by whom he had one daughter;
2. on 8 August 1899 to Rose Elizabeth, daughter of George Jay of Camden Town, who survived him without issue.

== Notes ==
Attribution

This article incorporates text from a publication now in the public domain: Lee, Sidney, ed. (1912). "Godwin, George Nelson". Dictionary of National Biography (2nd supplement). Vol. 2. London: Smith, Elder & Co.
