= Mrs. Bartle Teeling =

British writer (1851–1906)

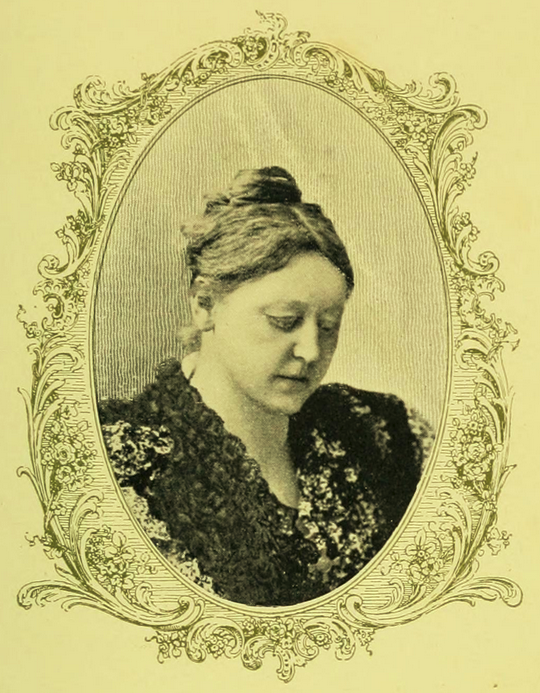
- Photo in "A Round table of the representative Irish and English Catholic novelists, 1897
- Born: Theodora M. Louisa Lane Clarke; 1851; Guernsey
- Died: November 1906 (aged 54–55)
- Occupation: Writer
- Spouse: Bartholomew John Teeling (m. 1879)
- Children: 7
- Parents: Rev. Thomas Clarke; Louisa Lane Clarke
- Writing career
- Pen name: Norman Stuart; Isola
- Language: English
- Genres: novels; biographies; theatre; music

Signature
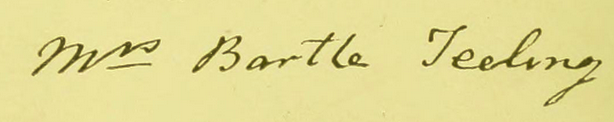

Mrs. Bartle Teeling (née, Clarke; pen names, Norman Stuart and Isola; 1851 – November 1906) was a British writer. She published dozens of articles and biographical sketches, as well as several books, a play, and some music.

== Early life ==
Theodora M. Louisa Lane Clarke was born in Guernsey, 1851, but passed her childhood in Woodeaton, Oxfordshire, where her father, Rev. Thomas Clarke, was Rector. Her mother, Louisa Lane Clarke, was the author of several scientific, topographical, and historical works on the Channel Islands. When Rev. Clarke died, his widow returned with their only child to Guernsey in 1865, and became there a centre of literary and scientific interest and mental activity as student and writer of natural history, and author of several scientific manuals.

== Career ==
Teeling's mother was a strong Protestant, but after years of anxious thought and deep but solitary research, for Teeling did not have a single Catholic acquaintance, she was received into the Catholic Church. Shortly after Teeling's conversion, while she was still under 21 years of age, she made her first essay in literature, at the request of Father William Lockhart, in The Lamp, of which he was editor.

After the death of her mother, Mrs. Teeling published some fifty articles and biographical sketches in The Month, Temple Bar, The Catholic World, and The Gentleman's Magazine. She was also a contributor to the American Catholic Quarterly Review, The Dolphin, Blackwood's Magazine, The Ecclesiastical Review, The Ave Maria, Le Femme Contemporaine, and several other literary and social magazines. Although she had seven young children to care for, scarcely a month passed that she had not an article in at least one of the many magazines to which she contributed. For a short time, she was a member of the Gosling Society, though it doesn't appear that she made any contributions of its magazine, The Monthly Packet.

Teeling used the pen name "Norman Stuart" for her writing, and the pseudonym "Isola" for composing and publishing music. Her publications include: Roman Violets (Burns & Oates), My Zouave (Burns & Oates), The Mission Cross (Washbourne), Her Last Stake (Benziger), The Violet Sellers (a play), Through Night to Light (a serial), as well as Music : A Song by Isola (Augener & Co.), and Old English Carols (Shapcott). She also published several biographies, chiefly of foreign celebrities, in leading U.S. and English reviews and magazines.

== Personal life ==
In 1879, she married Bartholomew ("Bartle") John Teeling (1848–1921). The marriage was solemnized by Father Lockhart, and was the first marriage which took place in St Etheldreda's Church since the Reformation.

Her husband served as captain in the Rifle Brigade, Secretary (1872) of the Catholic Union of Ireland, and Private Chamberlain to the Pope. Captain Bartle publications included, Military Maxims and Apophthegms of Commanders Ancient and Modern (Sampson Low), 1881; My Weatherwise Companion (Blackwood)' My First Prisoner, by the Governor (Aberdeen & London); "Arrested by Her Majesty's Guard of Honour" (The Month), 1895; "Oh, ye Châteaux of Savoy!" (The Month), 1895; and "A Day in Savoy" (New Ireland Review), 1899.

Two sons, Ambrose Teeling and Luke Joseph Teeling, died during World War I.

== Selected works ==
- Roman Violets, and Where They Blossom (Burns & Oates, 1879)
- The Mission Cross, its Work and its Triumph (Washbourne, 1880)
- My Zouave (Burns & Oates, 1892)
- Her Last Stake (Benziger)
- The Violet Sellers (play)
- Through Night to Light (serial)

=== Articles ===
- "Victor Hugo in exile", by Theodora Louisa Lane Teeling, The Irish Monthly, Vol. 8, No. 82 (Apr., 1880), pp. 191–199 (Text)
- "My Recollections of Victor Hugo", by Mrs. Bartle Teeling, Catholic World, Vol. 75 (Apr. 1902), pp. 52–64 (Text)

== Songs ==
- Music : A Song by Isola (Augener)
- Old English Carols (Shapcott)
