= Inveraray =

Town in Argyll and Bute, Scotland

Coordinates: 56°13′51″N 5°4′22″W

Inveraray: Scottish Gaelic: Inbhir Aora; Scots: Inverera
- Town
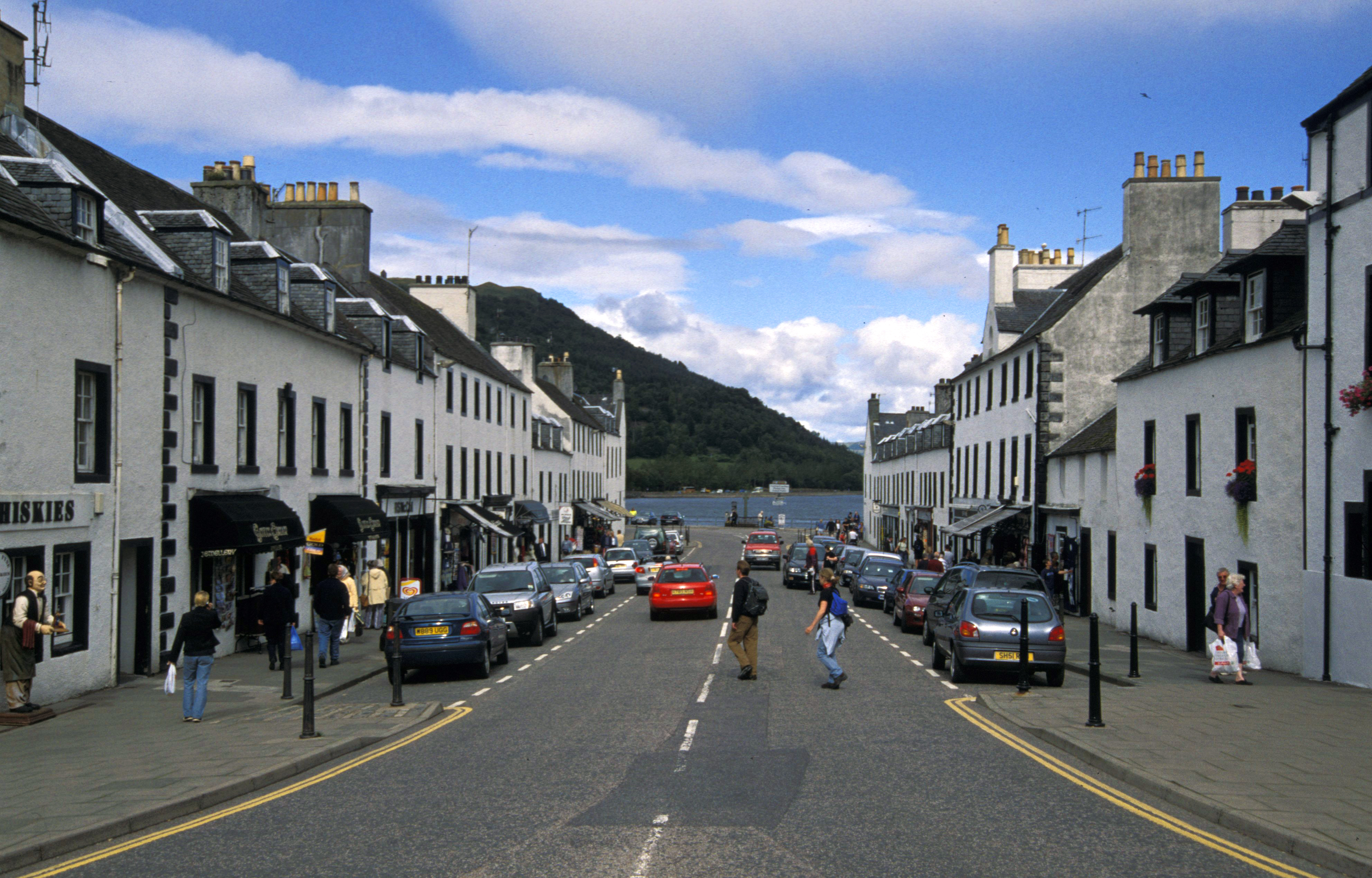
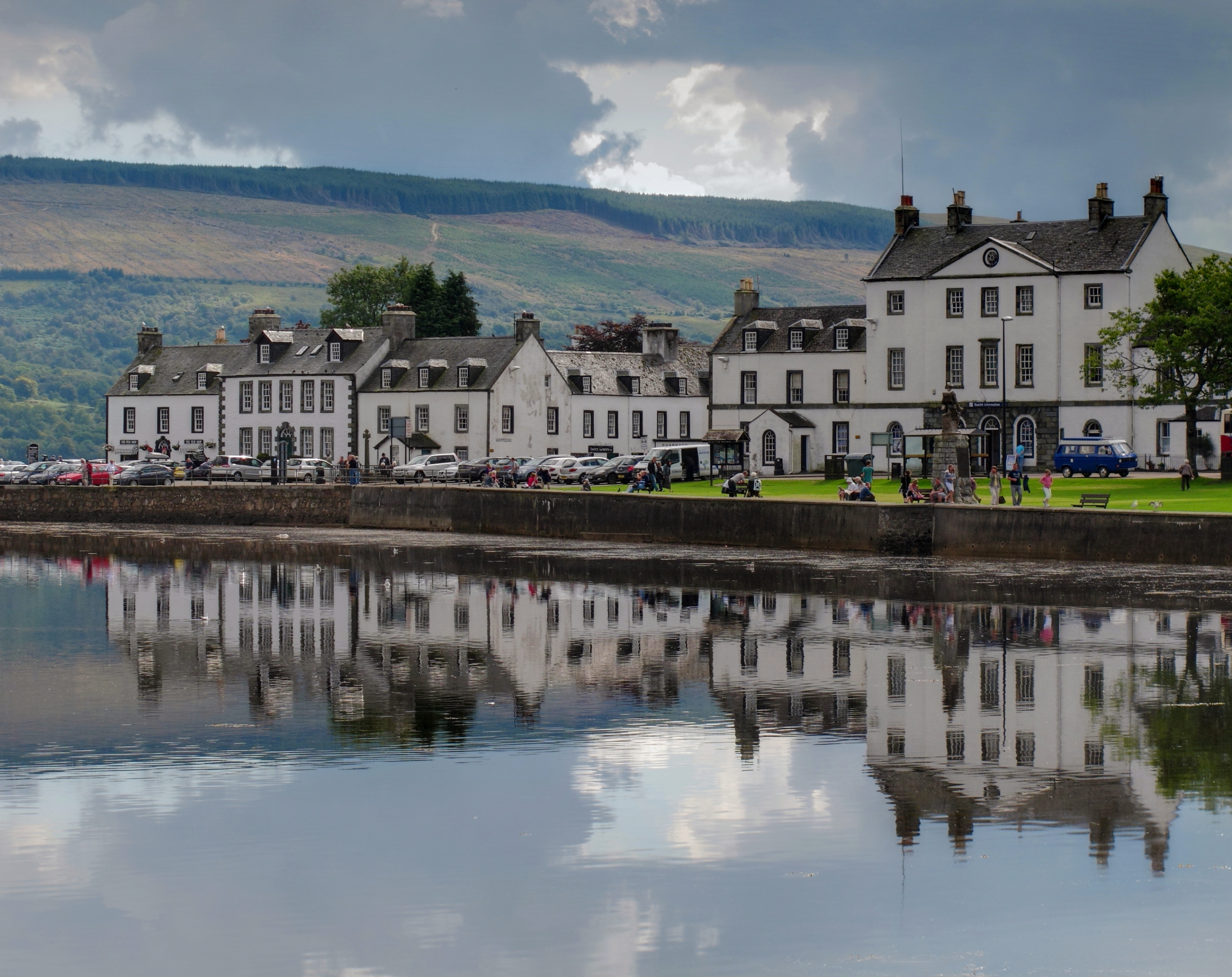
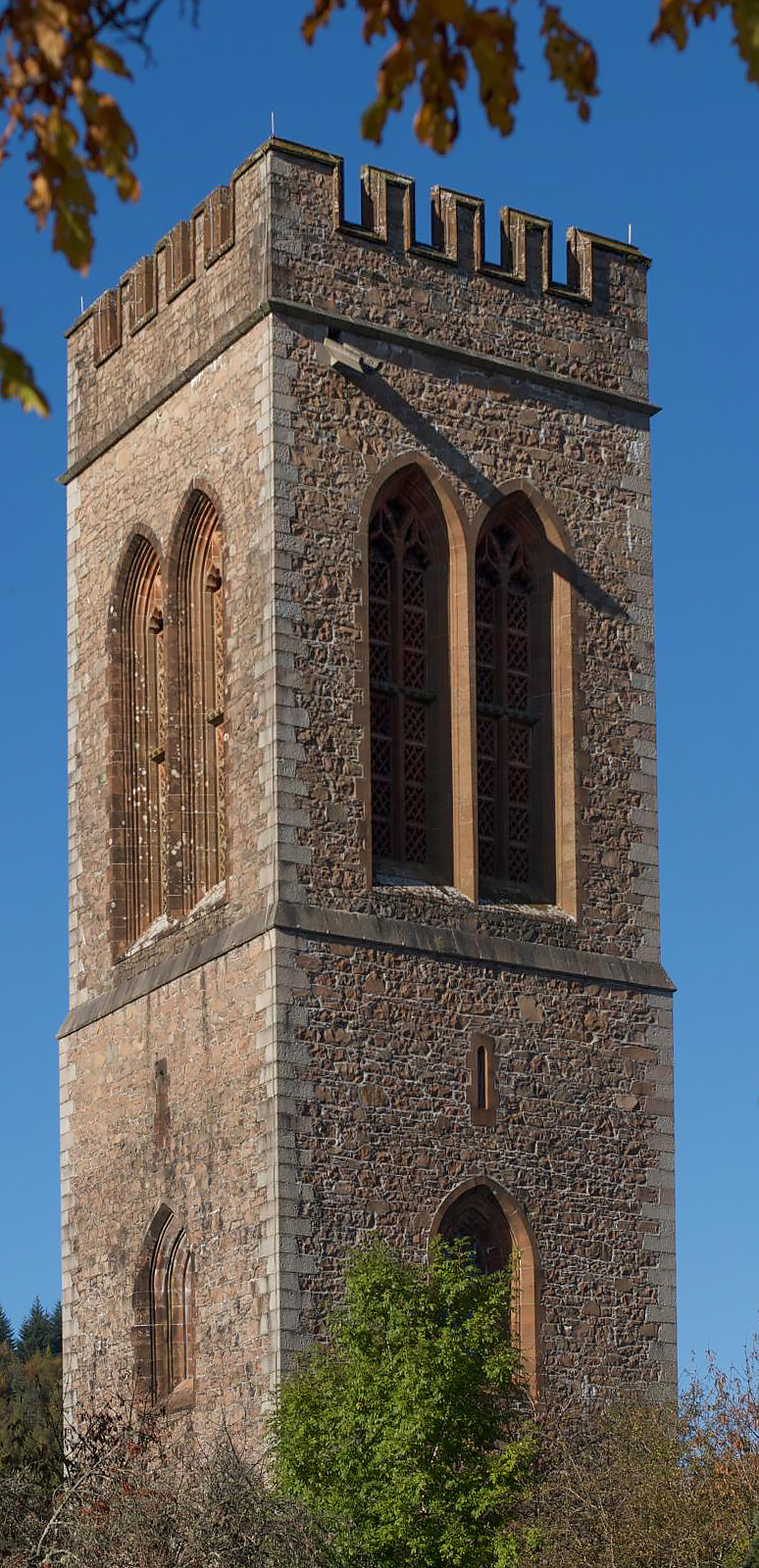
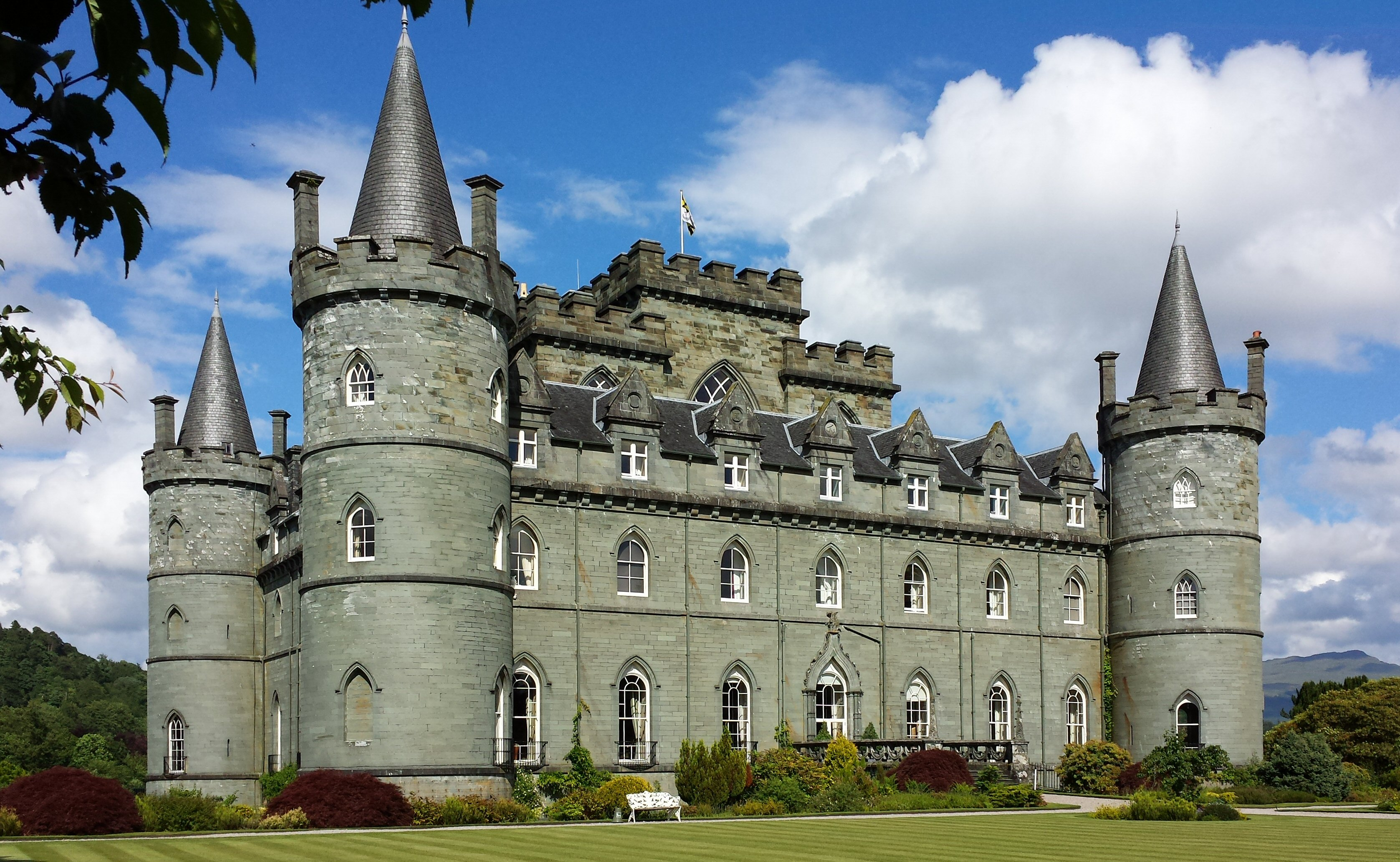
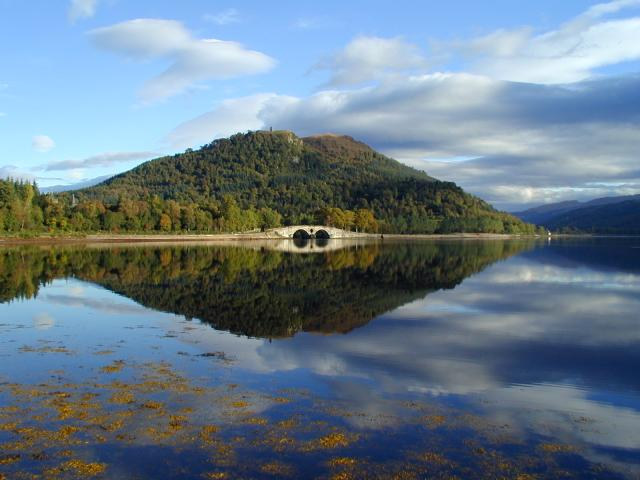
- Inveraray's Main Street Inveraray seafront The Duke's Tower Inveraray Castle Inveraray Bridge

- Location within Argyll and Bute
- Population: 601 (2022)
- OS grid reference: NN 09600 08500
  - Edinburgh: 75 mi (121 km)
  - London: 383 mi (616 km)
- Council area: Argyll and Bute
- Lieutenancy area: Argyll and Bute
- Country: Scotland
- Sovereign state: United Kingdom
- Post town: INVERARAY
- Postcode district: PA32
- Dialling code: 01499
- Police: Scotland
- Fire: Scottish
- Ambulance: Scottish
- UK Parliament: Argyll, Bute and South Lochaber
- Scottish Parliament: Argyll and Bute

Inveraray (/ˌɪnvəˈrɛəri/ or /ˌɪnvəˈrɛərə/; Scottish Gaelic: Inbhir Aora pronounced [iɲɪɾʲˈɯːɾə] meaning "mouth of the Aray") is a small coastal town in Argyll and Bute, Scotland. Located on the western shore of Loch Fyne, near its head, it is approximately 75 miles (121 km) west-northwest of Edinburgh, 54 miles (87 km) west-northwest of Glasgow, and 129 miles (208 km) east-southeast of Aberdeen.

Inveraray is a former royal burgh and known affectionately as "The Capital of Argyll." It is the traditional county town of Argyll, and the ancestral seat to the Duke of Argyll.

With a population of just only 601 inhabitants in 2022, Inveraray is considered to be the second-smallest-town in Scotland by population, behind New Galloway.

== History ==
=== The Old Town ===
The original town of Inveraray was situated on the estuary of the River Aray, at the intersection of the trading route through Glen Aray and the estuary where ships were able to anchor. The town grew up in the shadow of the first Inveraray Castle, home of the Earl of Argyll from the early 15th century.

To encourage trade there were various proposals for burgh status, with the 1st Earl of Argyll being successful in 1474 when King James III established it as a burgh of barony. This allowed a weekly market on Saturdays and two annual fairs: the feast of St Brandan on 16 May and the feast of Michael the Archangel on 29 September.

During the Wars of the Three Kingdoms, the Marquis of Montrose, and his army of Royalist supporters advanced into Argyll. Montrose's army burned and sacked Inveraray and the surrounding territory between December 1644 and January 1645. On 14 January 1645, Montrose left Inveraray and headed north where they would fight in the Battle of Inverlochy on 2 February 1645.

Inveraray became a Royal Burgh on 28 January 1648 following incorporation by Charles I. Records from 1690 and 1706 recorded about fifty properties in the town.

In 1746 a “summons of removal” was served on the people of the town, in order for the 3rd Duke of Argyll's vision for a new town to be built, half a mile away from where his new castle was being built. There were delays in work actually starting on the new town, with most of the houses in the old town not being demolished until 1771 to 1776, although some had been demolished in 1758 to allow for the construction of the military road.

=== Inveraray Castle ===
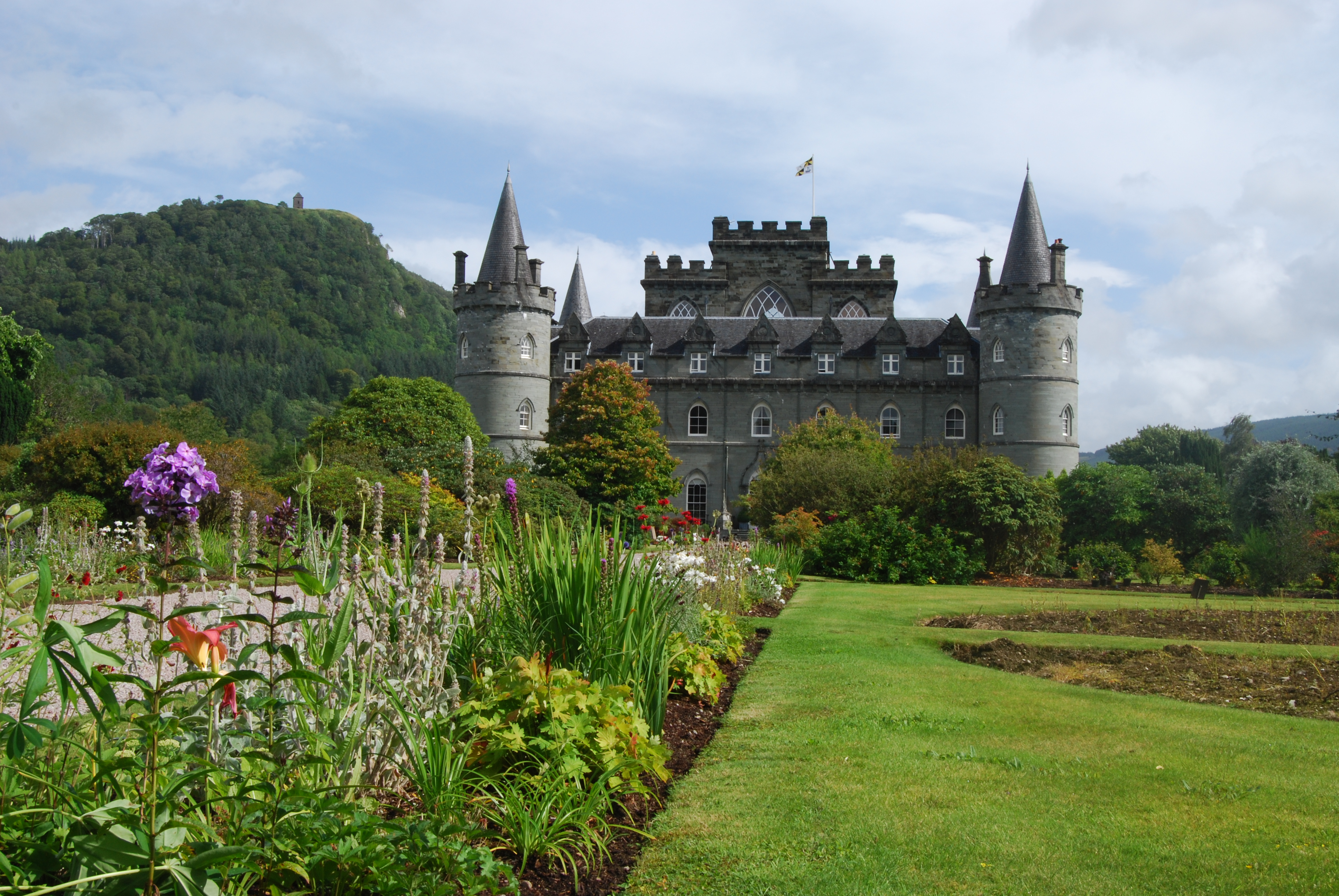
Inveraray Castle

The first Inveraray Castle was built around 1432 and by 1457 was the home of Colin, second Lord Campbell when he became first Earl of Argyll.

In 1744 the third Duke of Argyll decided to demolish the existing castle and start from scratch with a new building. The castle was 40 years in construction, and the work was largely supervised by the Adam family, still renowned to this day as gifted architects and designers. The end product was not a castle in the traditional sense, but a classic Georgian mansion house on a grand scale, Inveraray Castle.

Over the years the castle has played host to numerous luminaries; Queen Victoria visited it in 1847, and the Royal connection was further cemented when her daughter, Princess Louise, married the heir to the Campbell chieftainship,the Marquess of Lorne, in 1871, illustrating the elevated position of the Argyll family in the social order of the times.

Inveraray Castle has served as the ancestral seat of the Duke of Argyll and the chief of Clan Campbell since the 18th century. The current Duke and Clan Chief is Torquhil Campbell, 13th Duke of Argyll.

=== The New Town ===
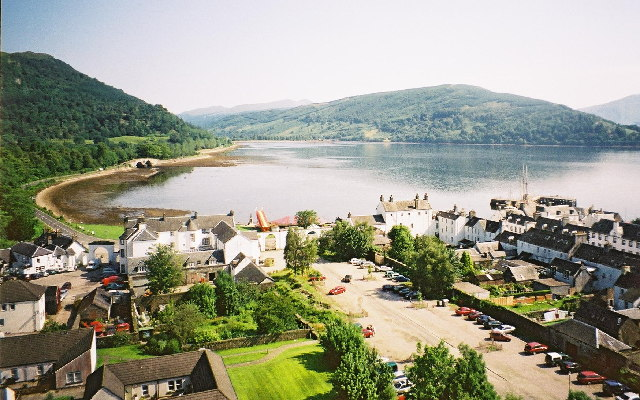
View from the Bell Tower.

In 1747, William Adam had drawn up plans for the creation of a new Inveraray. By 1770, little had been done, and the fifth Duke set about rebuilding the town in its present form. Some of the work on the rebuilt Inveraray was done by John Adam. The Inveraray Inn (formerly known as the New Inn, Great Inn, Argyll Arms Hotel and Argyll Hotel) on Front Street being his, as well as the Town House. Much of the rest of the town, including the church, was designed and built by the celebrated Edinburgh-born architect Robert Mylne (1733–1811) between 1772 and 1800.

The end product was an attractive town which included houses for estate workers, a woollen mill, and a pier to exploit herring fishing, which was to grow in later years to play a major role in the town's economy. The finished product is one of the best examples of an 18th-century new town in Scotland, and the vast majority of the properties in the centre of Inveraray are considered worthy of protection because of the town's architectural significance.

=== Fishing ===
The Annual Reports of the Fishery Board for Scotland provide an insight into fishing in Loch Fyne from Inverary in the years before the First World War.

Fishery Statistics

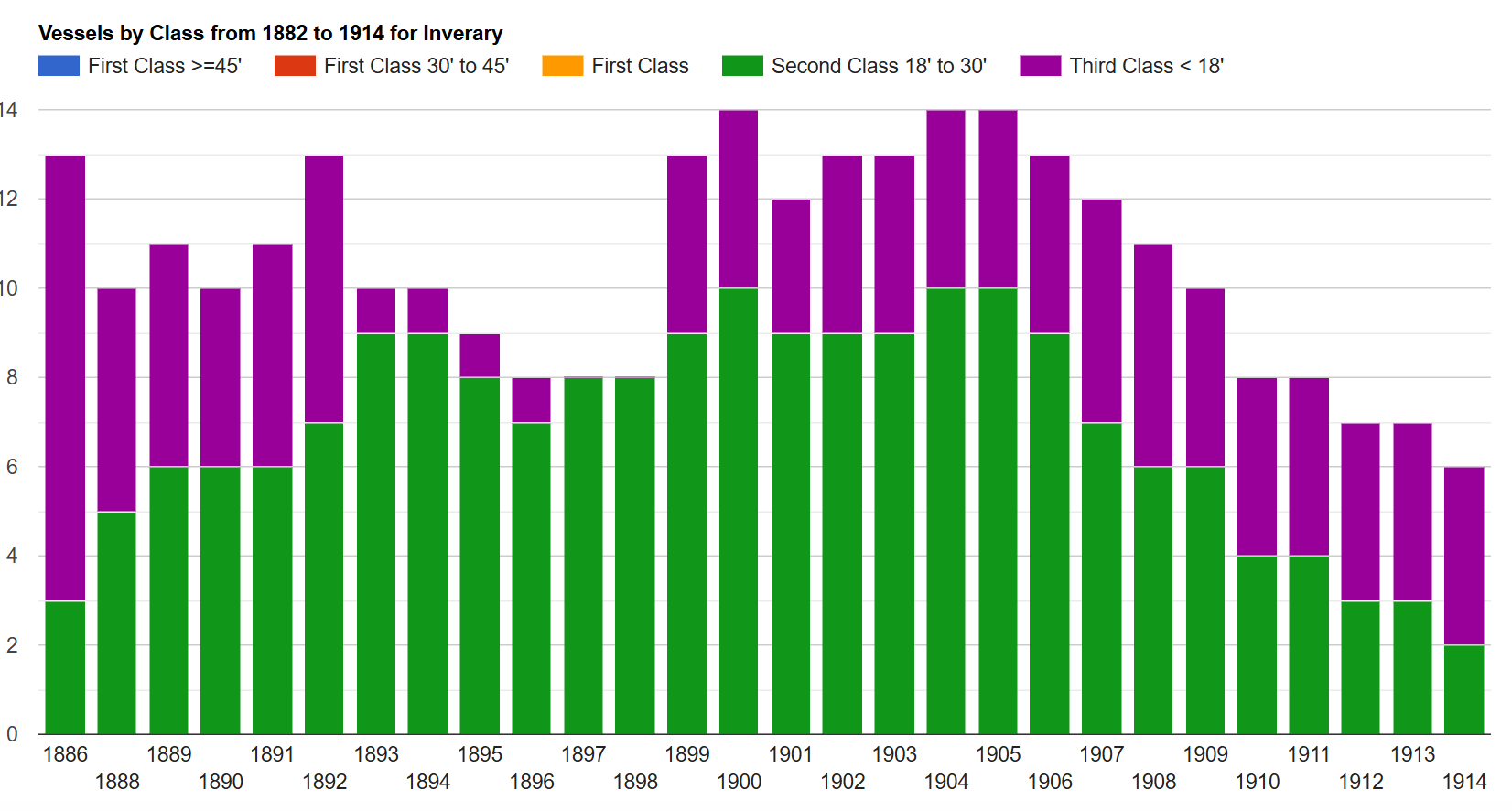
Vessels by class

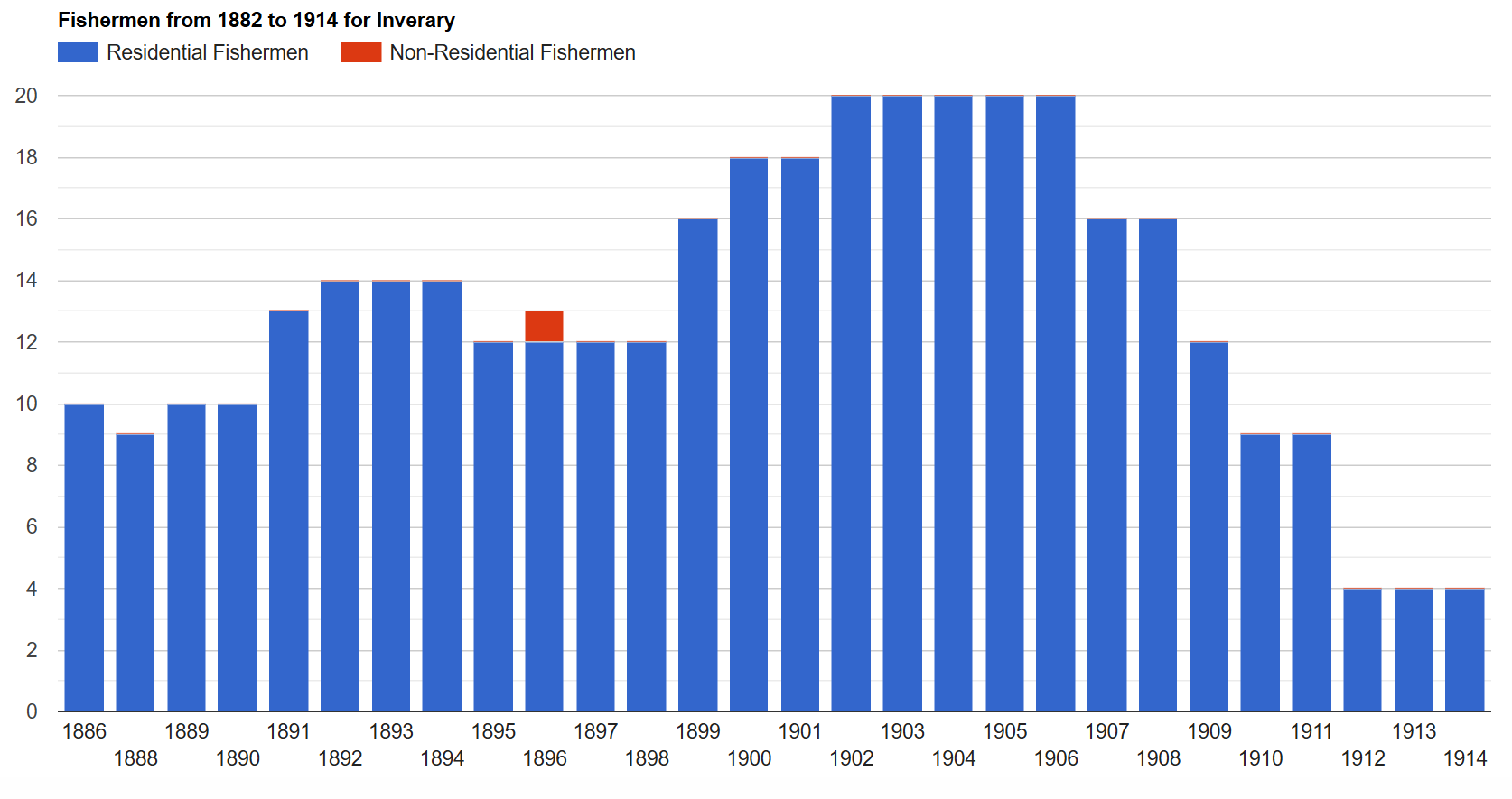
Fishermen

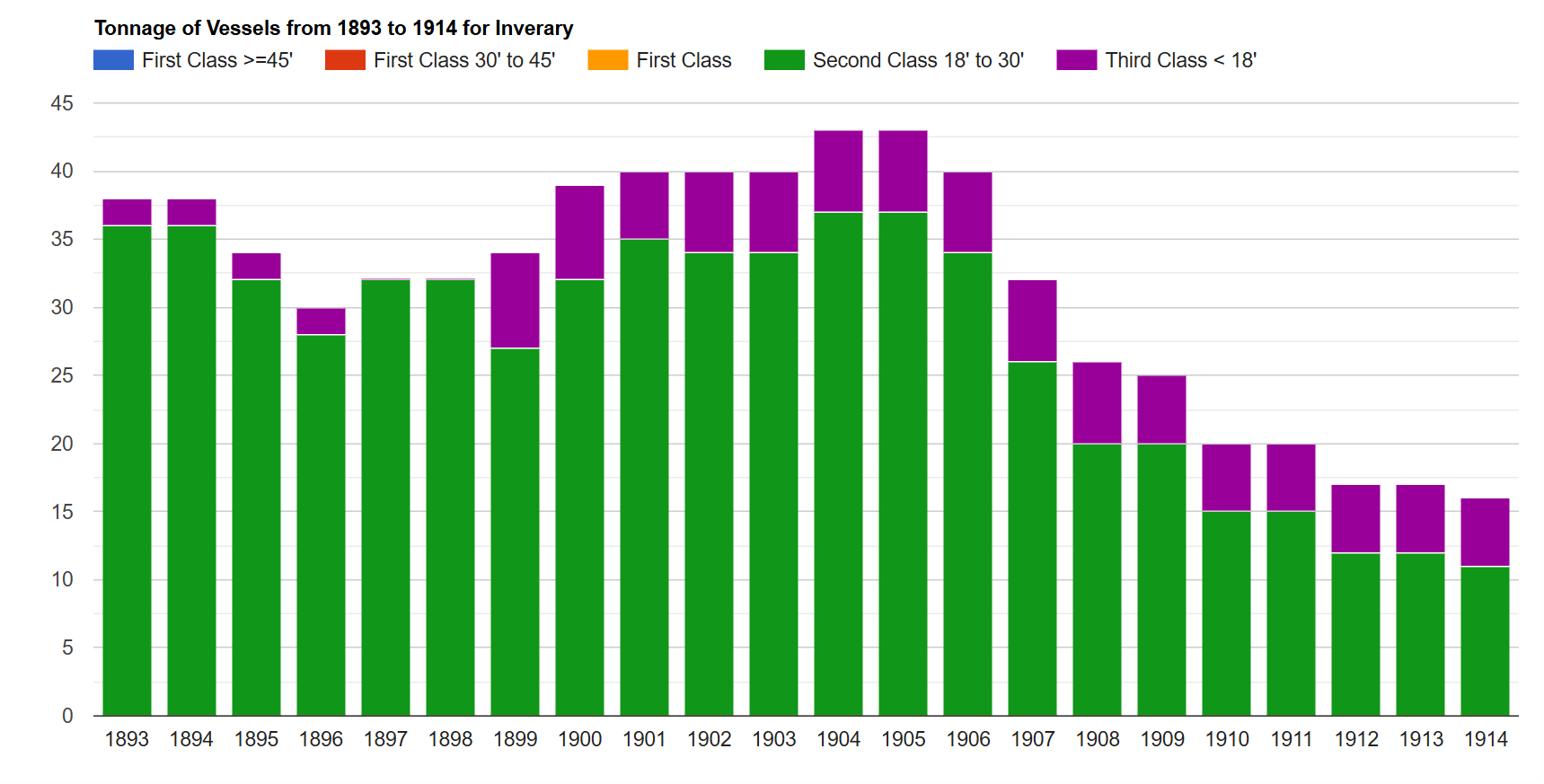
Tonnage of vessels

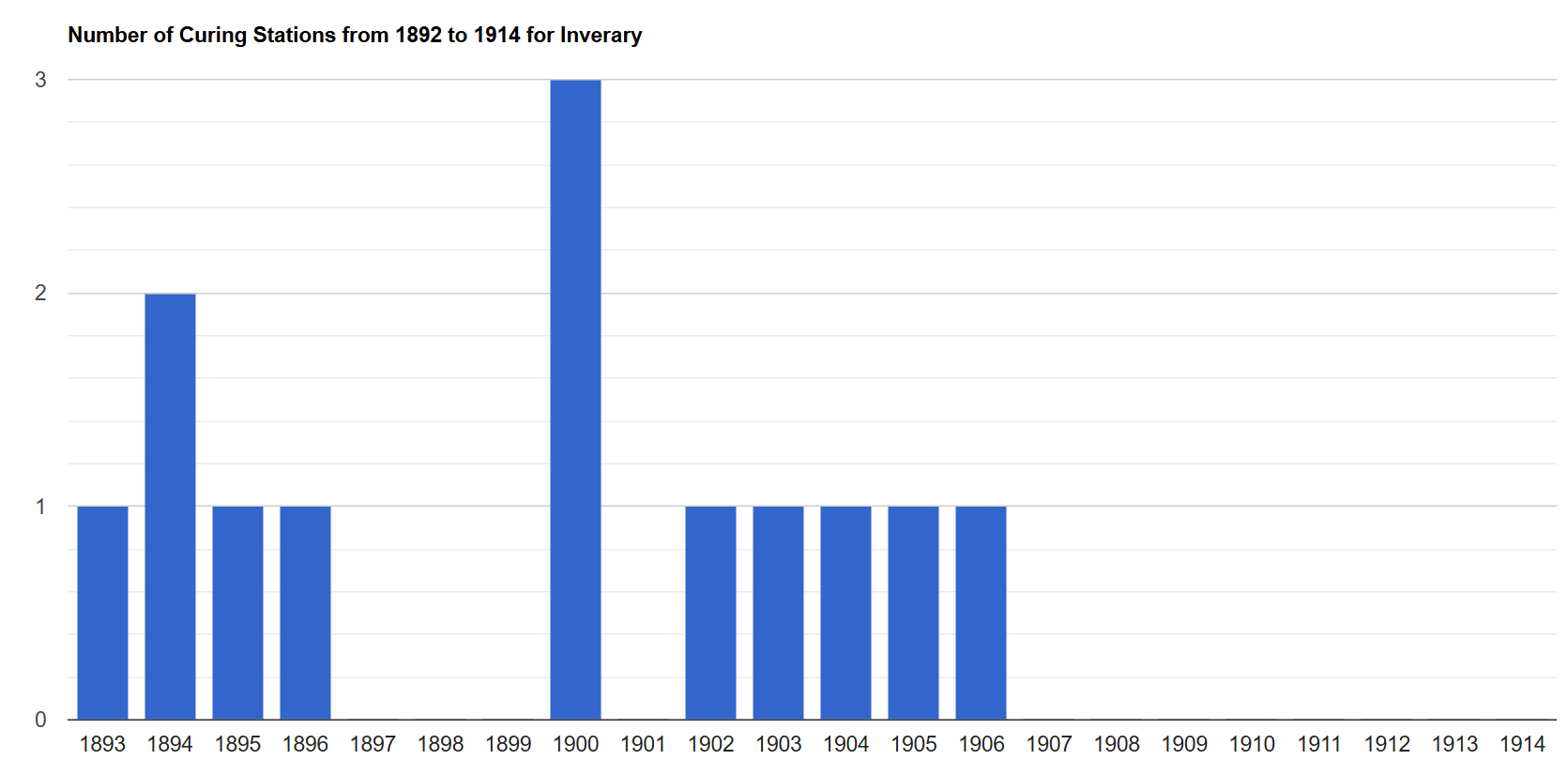
Number of curing stations

=== World War II ===
During the Second World War the Combined Operations Training Centre, located close to the town, was an important military facility. Between 1940 and 1944, roughly 250,000 allied soldiers received training at the centre. It was used primarily as a training site for the simulation of landing on enemy occupied beaches. The training provided here was pivotal in numerous missions, not to mention D-Day. The quality of the training benefited greatly from the multi-agency presence, combining the expertise of the army, navy and RAF.

=== Coat of Arms ===
Inveraray's coat of arms depicts a net cast out over the ocean, entangled in which are five herrings. Underneath the shield, the Latin words "SEMPER TIBI PENDEAT HALEC" (possible English translation: "may a herring always hang to thee") appear on an escrol.

Arthur Charles Fox-Davies, in his 1909 book A Complete Guide to Heraldry, notes the following:

There is no doubt of its ancient usage. ...and the blazon of the coat, according to the form it is depicted upon the Corporate seal, would be for the field: "The sea proper, therein a net suspended from the dexter chief and the sinister fess points to the base; and entangled in its meshes five herrings," which is about the most remarkable coat of arms I have ever come across.

== Tourist attractions ==
=== Inveraray Jail ===
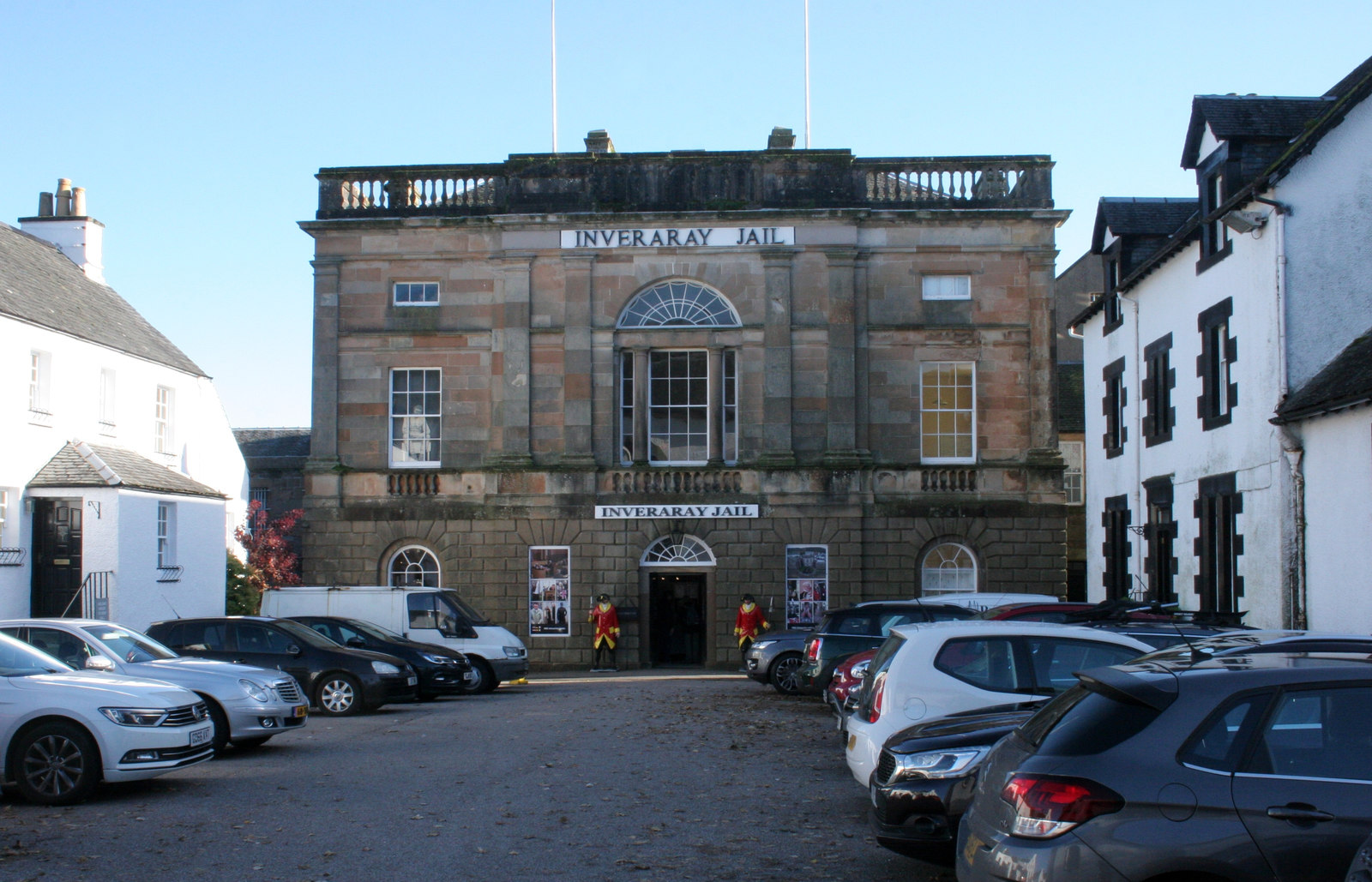
Inveraray Jail

The building was originally built as a courthouse and jail between 1816 and 1820. It was built on the 1813 design by James Gillespie Graham, which replaced Robert Reid's original design that had been abandoned due to lack of funds. Both the courthouse and the jail were opened in 1820. The courtroom, on the first floor, is a hemicycle with large windows overlooking the prison yard and Loch Fyne.

With the Prisons (Scotland) Act 1877, the government took control of the jail and began the construction of larger prisons in populated centres. The opening of Barlinnie Prison in Glasgow in 1882 led to the closure of small local jails in the west of Scotland, including Inveraray Jail in 1889. However, the court continued its activities until 1954.

Restoration work was undertaken in 1989 to convert the jail into a visitor attraction.

=== Mercat Cross ===
Dated from the 15th century, this cross was previously stood in the Old Town, but was later moved to the Inveraray Pier on the seafront end of the Inveraray Main Street.

=== Bell Tower ===
This detached bell tower southwest of the All Saints' Episcopal Church was built as a memorial to Campbells who perished in World War I and previous wars. Inveraray Bell Tower dominates the town, and contains the second-heaviest ring of ten bells in the world. The bell tower is open to the public, and the bells are rung regularly.

=== Dun Na Cuaiche, Tower ===
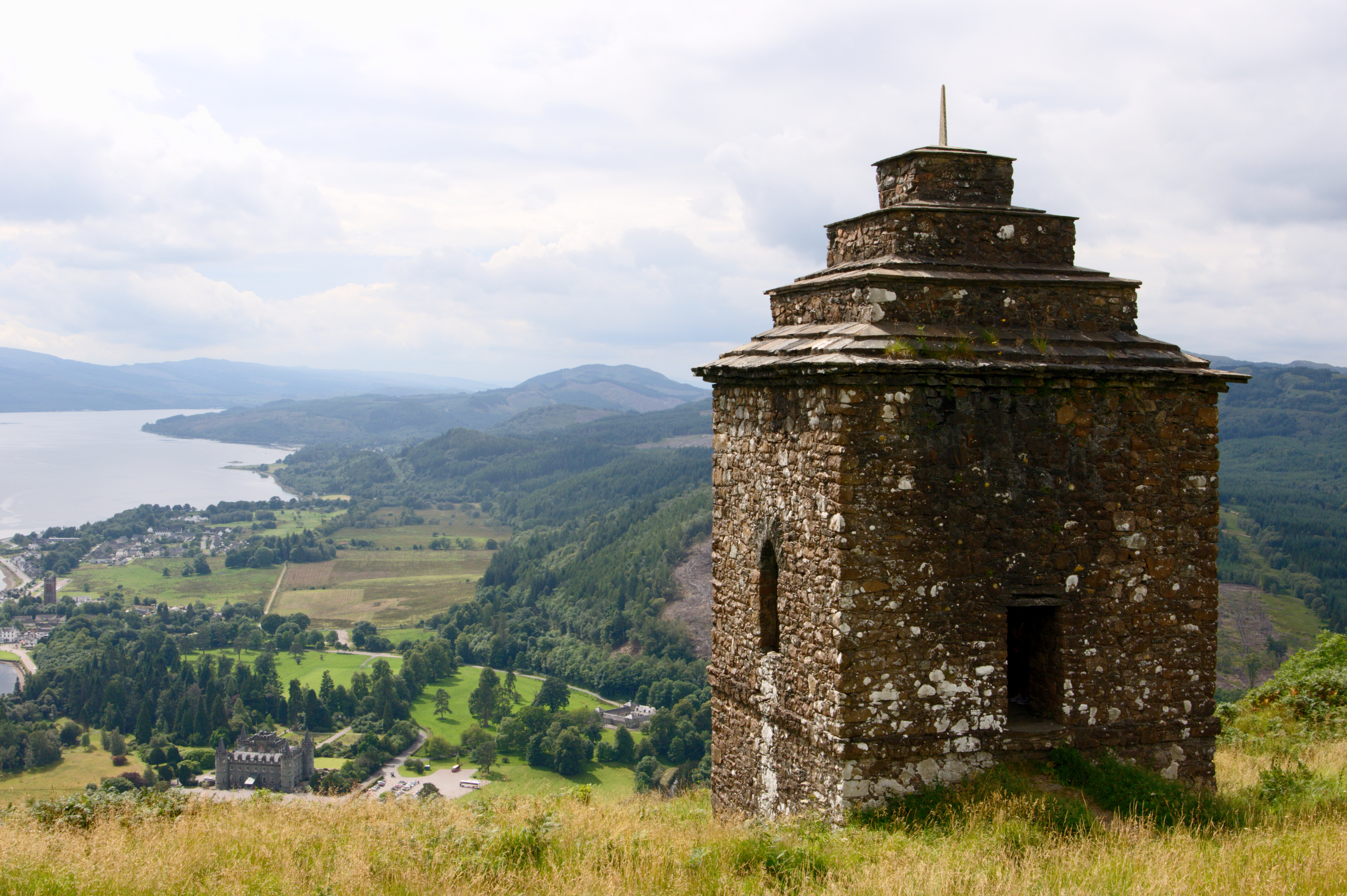
DunNaCuaiche 2013-08

The Dun Na Cuaiche tower is a folly, of a ruined watch tower, overlooking Inveraray and Loch Fyne. Built 1747–48 by William Douglas, at a contract price of £46 for the mason work, it was commissioned by the 3rd Duke of Argyll.

== Notable people ==
See also: Category:People from Inveraray

- Sir Archibald Campbell (1739–1791), British Army officer, colonial administrator and politician.
- Sir James Campbell (1763–1819), British Army officer, politician and colonial administrator.
- Zachary Macaulay (1768–1838), founder of London University.
- Eliza Maria Gordon-Cumming (1795–1842), aristocrat, horticulturalist, palaeontologist and scientific illustrator.
- Mary Elizabeth Hawker (1848–1908), writer of short-fiction.
- Neil Munro (1863–1930), journalist, newspaper editor, author and literacy critic.

== In popular culture ==
=== Novels ===
The journalist and author, Neil Munro, was born in Inveraray in 1863. Best known for his Para Handy Tales, about the Clyde Puffers, he also wrote a number of novels, some of which feature Inveraray, including John Splendid, The New Road and Doom Castle. He also wrote a number of poems.

=== Poetry ===
Robert Burns reflects coldly on his time spent in Inveraray in his poem 'Written at Inverary':

Whoe'er he be that sojourns here,

I pity much his case,

Unless he's come to wait upon

The Lord their God, his Grace.

There's naething here but Highland pride

And Highland cauld and hunger;

If Providence has sent me here,

T'was surely in his anger.

=== Film ===
The film, The Three Lives of Thomasina (1963) was filmed in Inveraray.

=== Television ===
Inveraray was featured in an episode of the PBS series Great Estates of Scotland, as was the present Duke of Argyll, head of Clan Campbell.

The town and Inveraray Castle were used as filming locations for the season 2 of the Netflix series The Diplomat. The town was also used as a filming location for 'Loch Henry,' the second episode of season six of Netflix's Black Mirror.

== Gallery ==
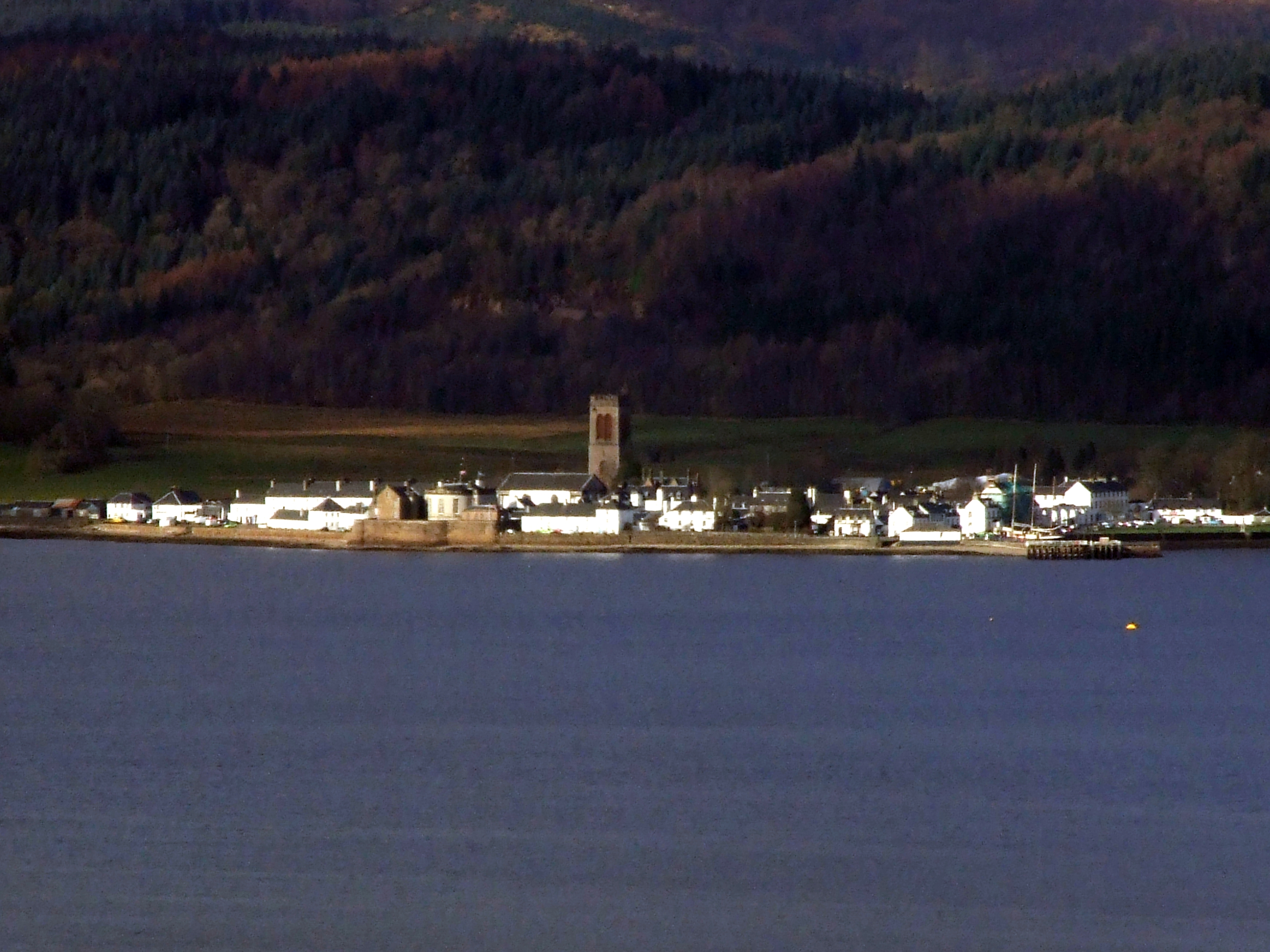
Inveraray, viewed from the B839 on the Eastern side of Loch Fyne, above St Catherines

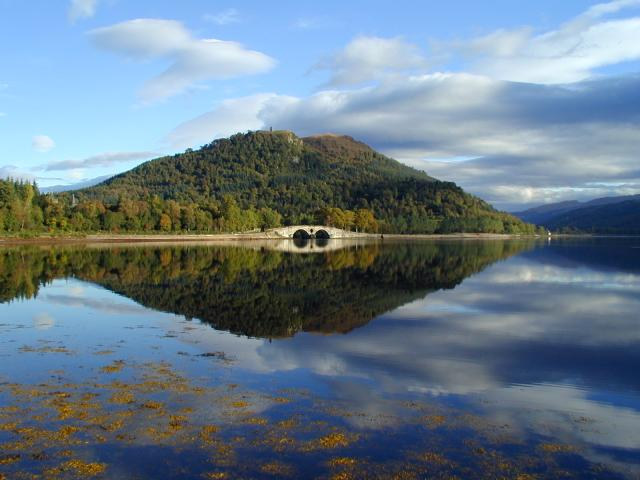
Aray Bridge on Loch Fyne from Inveraray. The spires of Inveraray Castle can just be seen on the left. The hill behind the bridge is Dun Corr Bhile

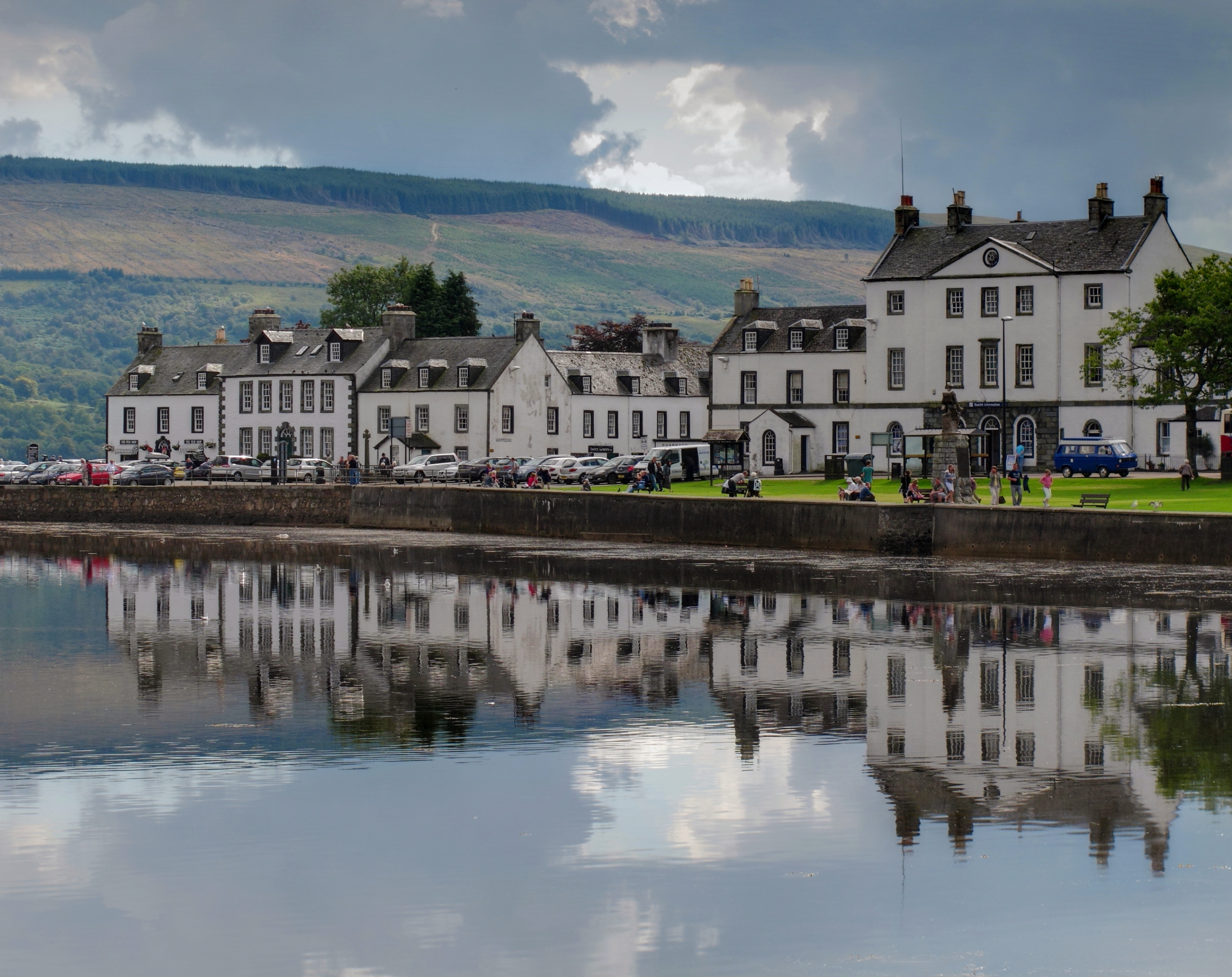
Inveraray reflections

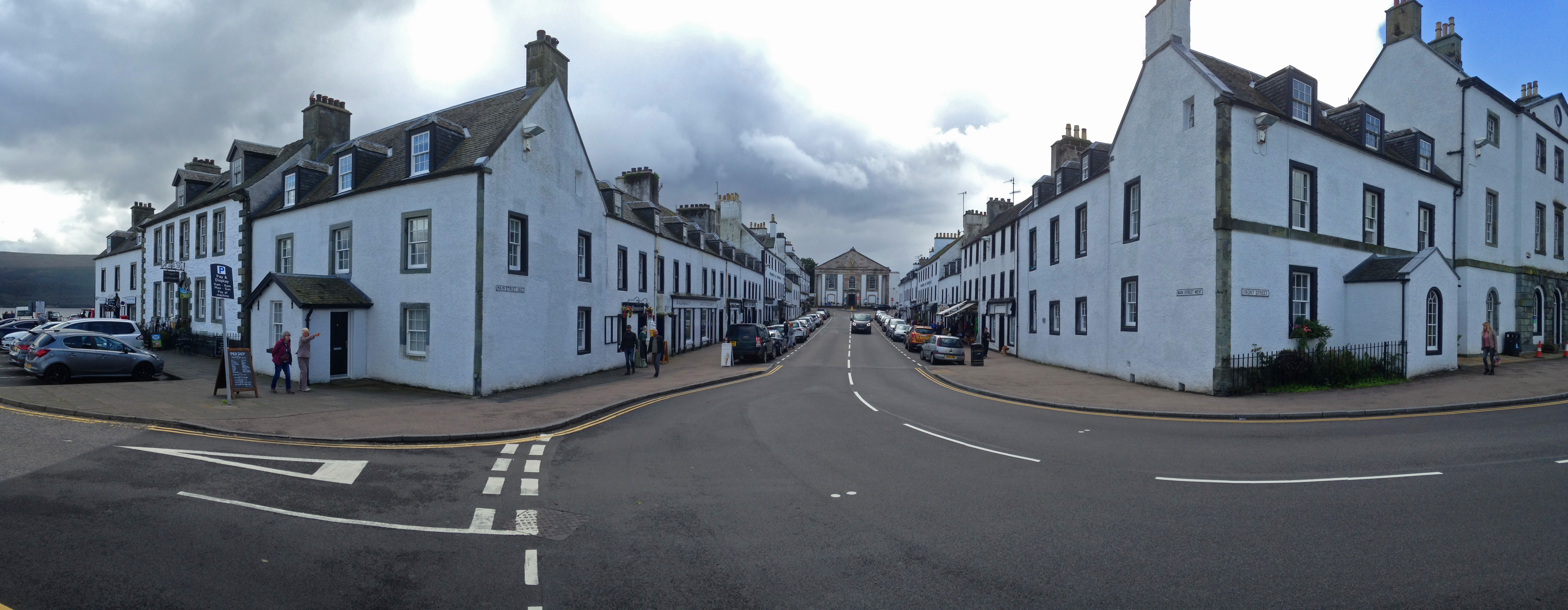
Main street of Inveraray

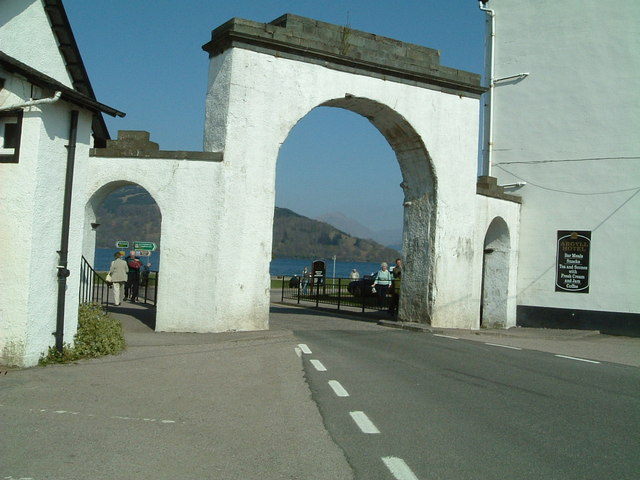
Archway from Inveraray town

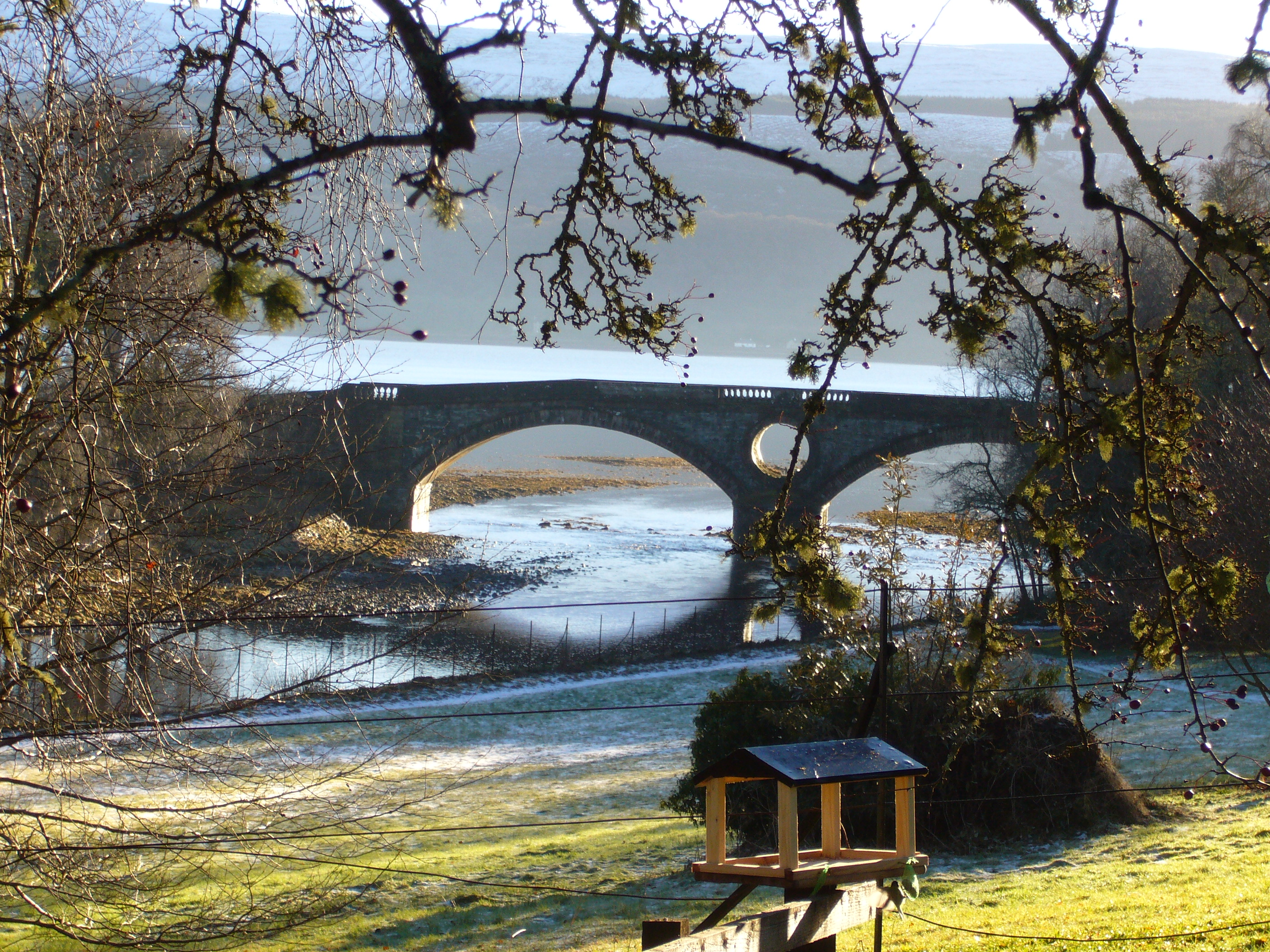
Aray Bridge

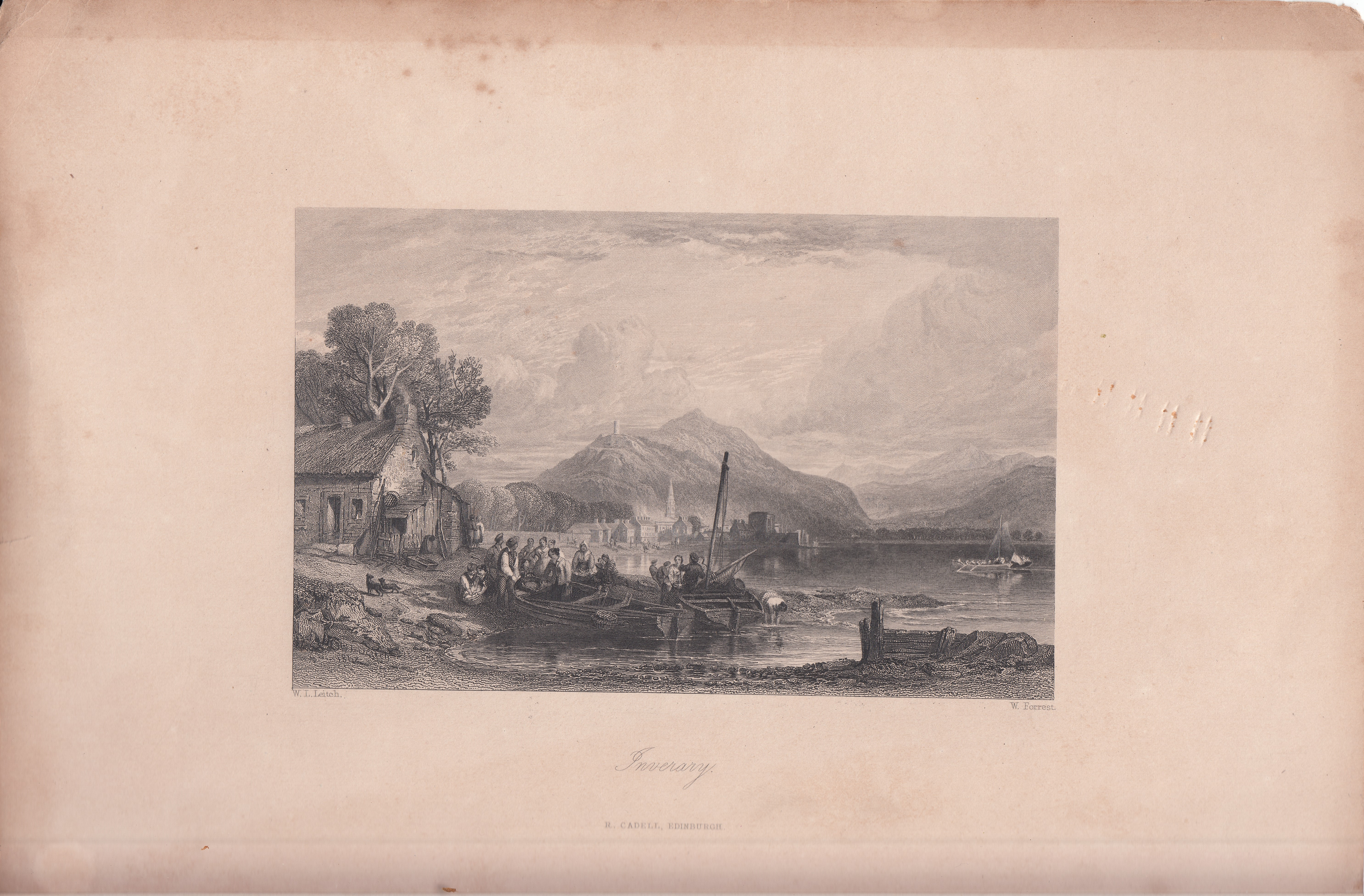
Inveraray 1844 from Waverley Novels vol. iv
