= The Celebration in East Bergholt of the Peace of 1814 =

Painting by John Constable

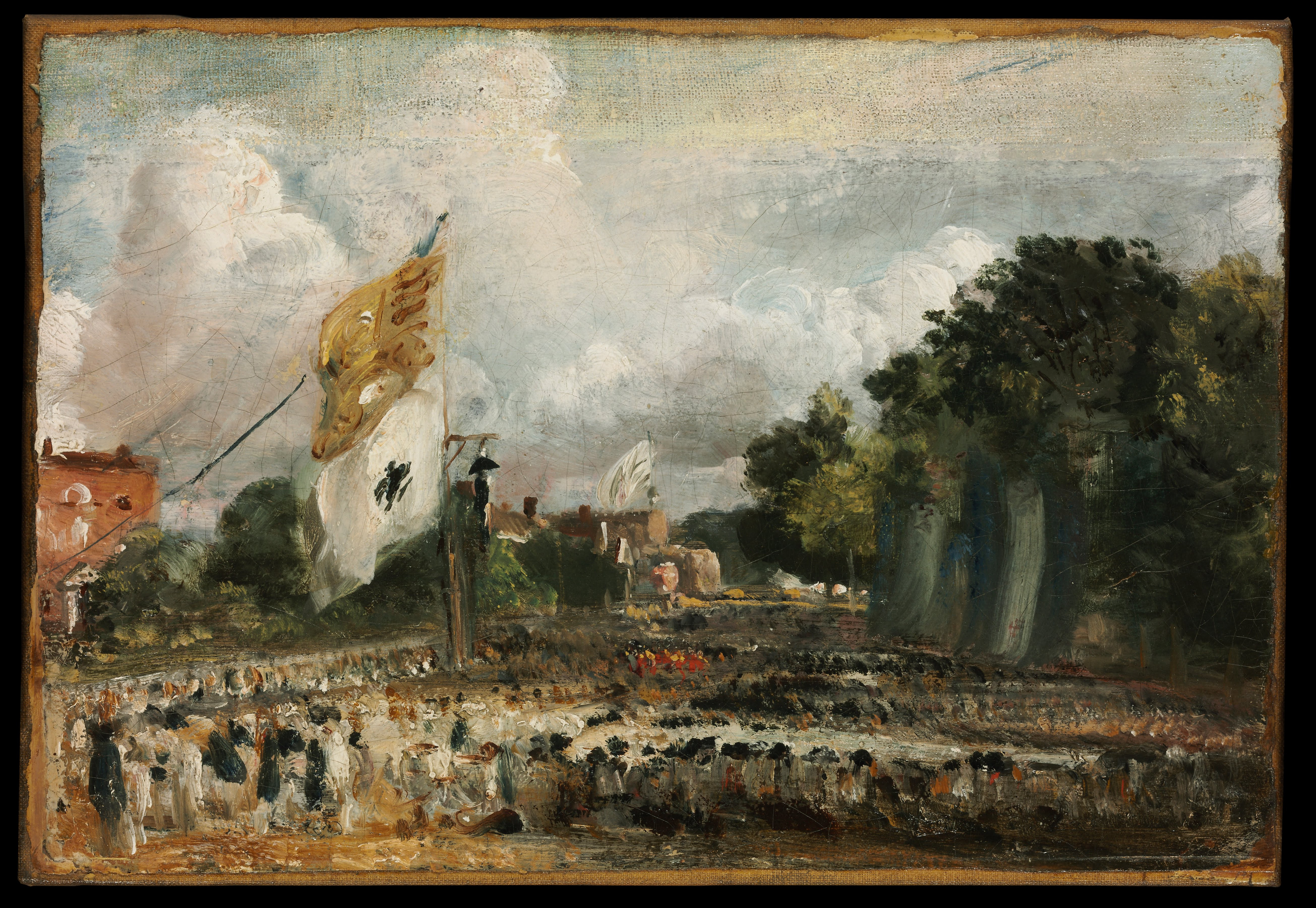
- Artist: John Constable
- Year: 1814
- Type: Oil on canvas, Landscape painting
- Dimensions: 23 cm × 33.5 cm (9.1 in × 13.2 in)
- Location: Museum of Fine Arts; Budapest

The Celebration in East Bergholt of the Peace of 1814 is an oil painting by the British artist John Constable. It depicts the banquet held in his native village of East Bergholt in Suffolk to celebrate the victory over Napoleon and the Treaty of Paris.

On 9 July 1814 eight hundred of the inhabitants sat down for an outdoor feast to commemorate the end of the Napoleonic Wars. He did both a pencil sketch a fuller oil version of the scene. The final work shows the guests seated outside at long tables. Also featured is the flag of the restored Bourbon Monarchy of France as well as an effigy of the defeated Napoleon. Today it is in the Museum of Fine Arts in Budapest, having been acquired in 1913.

== See also ==
- List of paintings by John Constable

== Bibliography ==
- Benkő, Éva, Garas, Klára & Urbach, Zsuzsa . Old Masters' Gallery: German, Austrian, Bohemian and British paintings. Visual Arts Publishing, 2003.
- Charles, Victoria. Constable. Parkstone International, 2015.
- Hamilton, James. Constable: A Portrait. Hachette UK, 2022.
