= Treaty of Paris (1814) =

Agreement ending the War of the Sixth Coalition

- Type: Peace treaty
- Context: Napoleonic Wars
- Signed: 30 May 1814
- Location: Paris, France
- Parties: France Sixth Coalition: United Kingdom; Russia; Austria; Prussia

The Treaty of Paris, signed on 30 May 1814, ended the war between France and the Sixth Coalition, part of the Napoleonic Wars, following an armistice signed on 23 April between Charles, Count of Artois, and the allies. The treaty set the borders for France under the House of Bourbon and restored territories to other nations. It is sometimes called the First Peace of Paris, as another one followed in 1815.

== Treaty of Paris ==
This treaty was signed on 30 May 1814, following an armistice signed on 23 April 1814 between Charles of Bourbon, Count of Artois, as Lieutenant General of the Realm, and the allies. Napoleon had abdicated as Emperor on 6 April, as a result of negotiations at Fontainebleau.

Peace talks had started on 9 May between Talleyrand, who negotiated with the allies of Chaumont on behalf of the exiled Bourbon king Louis XVIII, and the allies. The Treaty of Paris established peace between France and Great Britain, Russia, Austria, and Prussia, who in March had defined their common war aim in Chaumont. Signatories were:

- Talleyrand, for France
- Lords Castlereagh, Aberdeen and Cathcart for Great Britain
- Counts Razumovsky and Nesselrode for Russia
- Prince Metternich and Count Stadion for Austria
- Baron Hardenberg and Wilhelm von Humboldt for Prussia.

The Treaty was also signed by Portugal and Sweden while Spain ratified shortly after in July. The allied parties did not sign a common document, but instead concluded separate treaties with France allowing for specific amendments.

== New borders of France ==
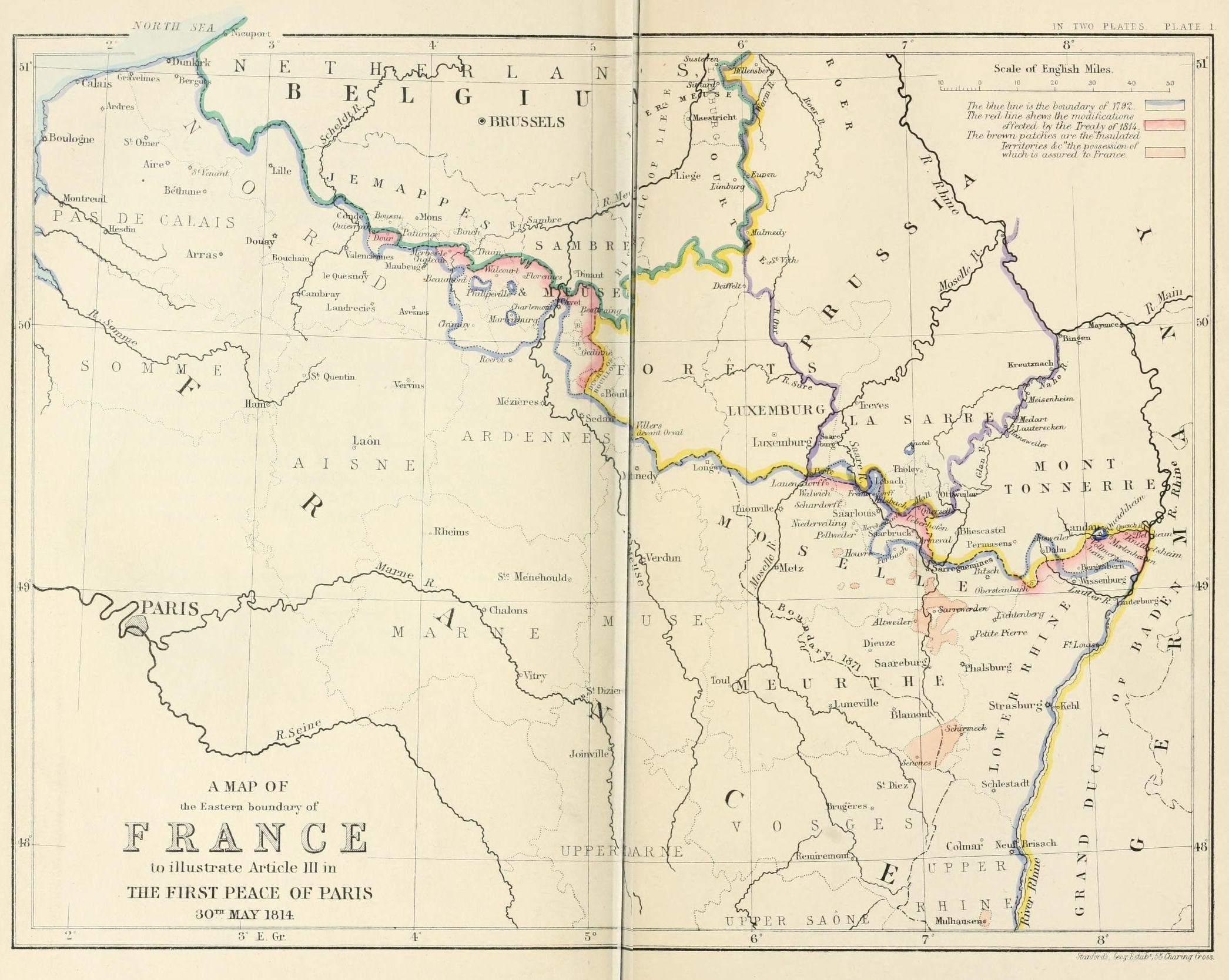
Eastern boundary of France as defined in Article III of the First Peace Treaty of Paris (30th May 1814)

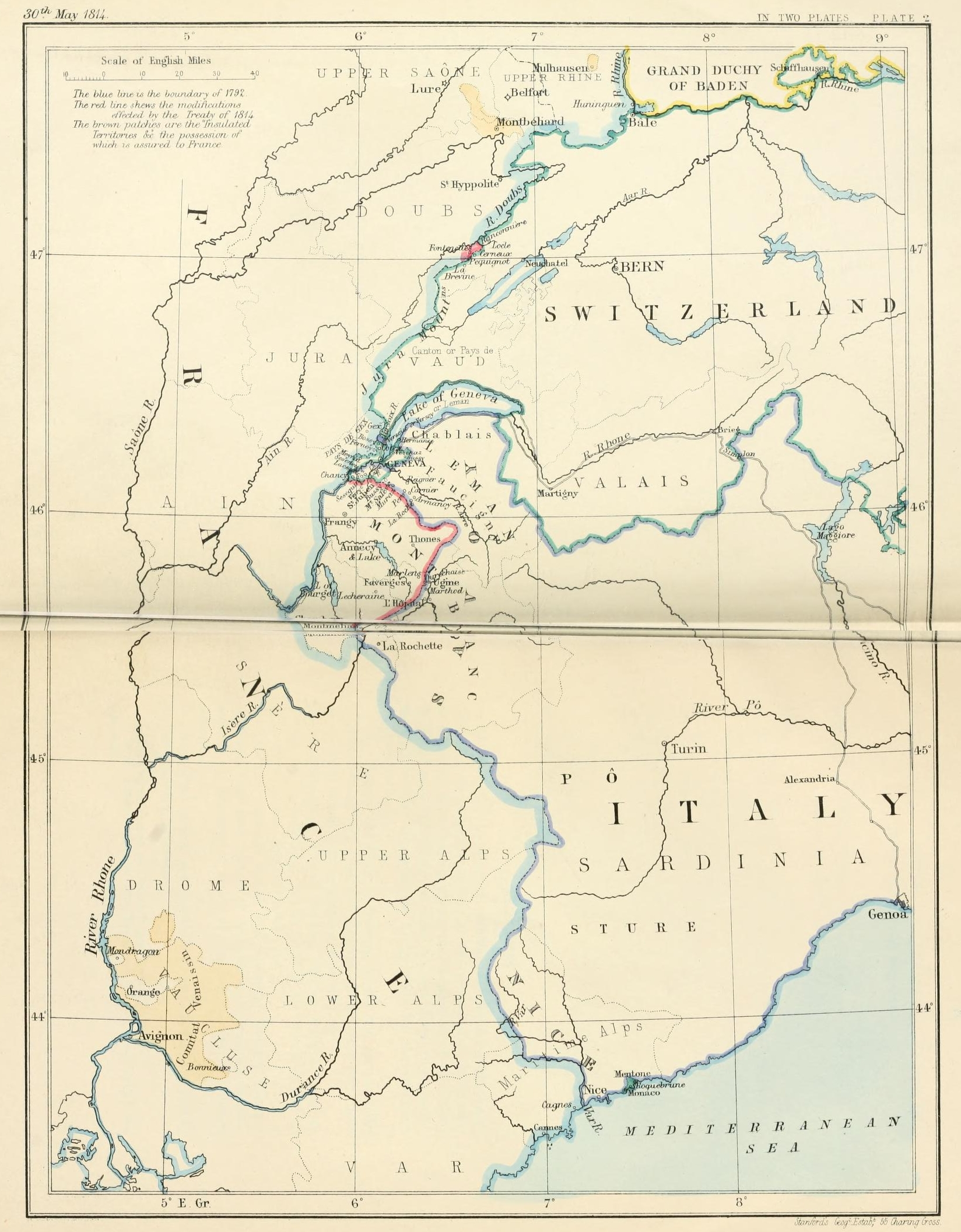
Southeast frontier of France after the Treaty of Paris (1814)

The allies had agreed to reduce France to her 1792 borders and restore the independence of her neighbors after Napoleon Bonaparte's defeat.

== Plan for Congress of Vienna ==
In addition to the cessation of hostilities, the treaty provided a rough draft of a final settlement, which according to article 32 was to be concluded within the next two months at a congress involving all belligerents of the Napoleonic Wars. This provision resulted in the Congress of Vienna, held between September 1814 and June 1815.

The Allies declared that their aim was to establish a lasting peace based on a just distribution of forces among the powers, and considered it not necessary to impose harsh conditions on France as she had been restored to a monarchy. Thus the preliminary conditions already agreed in Paris were moderate for France so as not to disturb the re-enthronement of the returned Bourbon king: France's borders of 1 June 1792 were confirmed, and in addition, she was allowed to retain Saarbrücken, Saarlouis, Landau, the County of Montbéliard, part of Savoy with Annecy and Chambéry, also Avignon and the Comtat Venaissin as well as artifacts acquired during the war, while on the other hand she had to cede several colonies.

To distinguish this agreement from a second treaty of Paris, concluded on 20 November 1815 as one of the treaties amending Vienna, the treaty of 30 May 1814 is sometimes referred to as the First Peace of Paris.

== Territories of other nations ==
The treaty reapportioned several territories amongst various countries. Most notably, France retained all European territory that it possessed on 1 January 1792 and also reacquired many of the territories lost to Britain during the war. They included Guadeloupe (Art. IX), which had been ceded to Sweden by Britain when it entered the coalition. In return, Sweden was compensated 24 million francs, which gave rise to the Guadeloupe Fund. The only exceptions were Tobago, Saint Lucia, Seychelles and Mauritius, all of which were handed over to British control. Britain kept sovereignty over the island of Malta (Art. VII).

The treaty returned to Spain the territory of Santo Domingo, which had been transferred to France by the 1795 Peace of Basel (Art. VIII). The Peace of Basel had implicitly recognised French sovereignty over Saint-Domingue, which Dessalines later proclaimed independent under the name of Haiti. France did not recognize the independence of Haiti until 1824.

This treaty formally recognized the independence of Switzerland (Art. VI).

== House of Bourbon ==
The treaty recognised the Bourbon monarchy in France, in the person of Louis XVIII, because the treaty was between Louis XVIII the king of France and the heads of states of the Coalition great powers (Preamble to the treaty).

== Slave trade and slavery ==
The treaty aimed to abolish the French slave trade in France (but not slavery) over a five-year period (Additional Art. I). The territories of France were not included in this aim. This aim was also included in the succeeding 1815 treaty, applying to all parties, but with "without loss of time" rather than by a given date.

== Aftermath ==
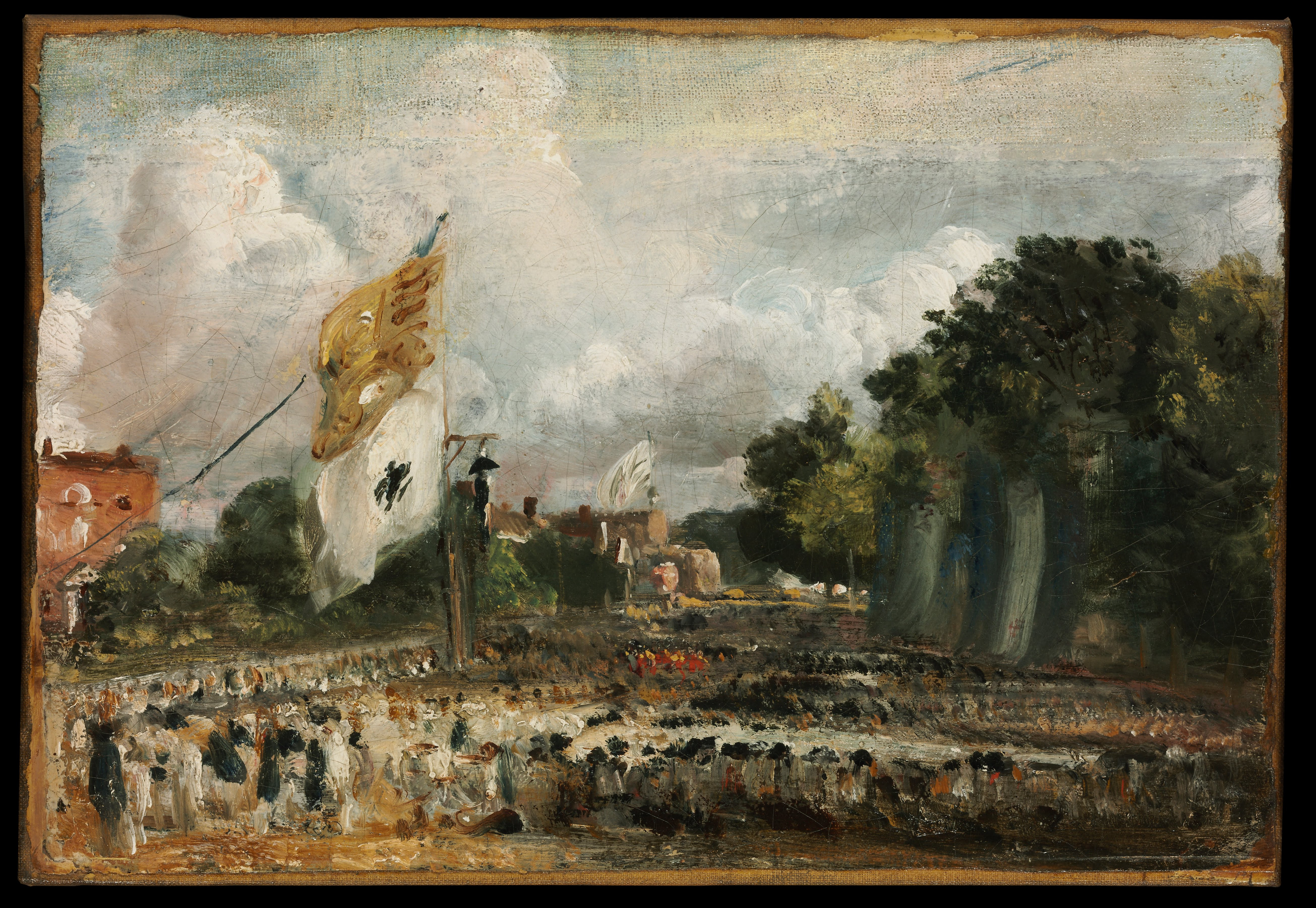
The Celebration in East Bergholt of the Peace of 1814 by John Constable.

Several powers, despite the peaceful intentions of the treaty, still feared a reassertion of French power. The Netherlands, now freed from the French empire, asked William I of the House of Orange to be their prince; he accepted in late 1813. This was a first step to what occurred in 1815 during the Congress of Vienna and simultaneously, Napoleon's Hundred Days. In March 1815, the United Kingdom of the Netherlands was formed, which added the former territory of the low countries that had been ruled by the Austrian Empire to the Netherlands, and had William I as its king. His son William joined the fighting at Waterloo, whose battle site was located in the United Kingdom of the Netherlands. Though the Dutch initiated their request to William I, the great powers of the Napoleonic wars had made a secret pact to support a strong nation on that border with France with William as its king, in the Eight Articles of London, signed on 21 June 1814. Thus the action by the Dutch had the strong support of Britain and the other signatories of that pact.

Many German states had been consolidated by Napoleon, and retained that status after the Treaty of Paris of 1814. Prussia gained territory in western Germany, near the border with France, in a swap with William I of the Netherlands. In Italy, several different political entities were recognized.

Following Napoleon's brief return to power and defeat, a new Treaty of Paris was signed the following year.

== See also ==
- List of treaties

== Bibliography ==
- EB staff (2014). "Treaties of Paris (1814–1815)". Britannica Online Encyclopedia.
- Büsch, Otto (1992). Handbuch der preußischen Geschichte (in German). Vol. 3. Walter de Gruyter. pp. 72–74, 81. ISBN 3-11-008322-1.
- Malettke, Klaus (2009). Die Bourbonen 3. Von Ludwig XVIII. bis zu den Grafen von Paris (1814–1848) (in German). Vol. 3. Kohlhammer Verlag. p. 66. ISBN 978-3-17-020584-0.
- Rudolf, Uwe Jens; Berg, W. G. (2010). Historical Dictionary of Malta. US: Scarecrow Press. p. 11. ISBN 9780810853171.
- Alexander Rich, Gisela Gledhill, and Jerzy Kierkuć-Bieliński; (2014) Peace Breaks Out! London and Paris in the Summer of 1814, London: Sir John Soane's Museum, in print
