= Li Osborne =

- Born: Luisa Friedericke Susanna Wolf; January 4, 1883; Mainz
- Died: August 19, 1968 (aged 85); Monte Brè/Locarno
- Spouses: In 1907 she married Leo Karl Benecke, a Prussian officer. They divorced in 1913 after the death of their daughter, who died of typhus at the age of four.; From 1920 to 1929 she was married to the Czech psychiatrist Walter Carl Henry Osborne.; In 1930 she became the second wife of William Doge Hutchinson. They remained married until his death in 1966.

Li Osborne (née Luisa Friedericke Susanna Wolf; 4 January 1883 – 19 August 1968), also known as Louise Hutchinson, was a German-born, later British, portrait and figure photographer and sculptor in bronze and terracotta.

== Biography ==
Osborne was born in Mayence, later Mainz, and was educated in Freiburg, Geneva and London. Her mother was Bavarian and her father was a naturalised British subject. In 1920 Osborne had her first photographic exhibition in Copenhagen. Between 1922 and 1924 she operated a portrait studio in Baden-Baden and in 1925 she located the studio to Giselastraße 1, in Munich. In this time she also made theater-photography. In 1925 Osborne became a member of the Gesellschaft Deutscher Lichtbildner, Society of German Photographers. Her portrait subjects included Jean Arp, Albert Schweitzer and a production of King Lear in a style tinged with expressionism. In 1934 Osborne sold her studio and emigrated to Switzerland. During World War II, in Zurich, she began to teach herself sculpture. Although largely self-taught as a sculptor, she received advice from many internationally known artists, while living in Switzerland.

In 1945 Osborne moved to East Bergholt in England and dedicated her time to sculpture. Her sculptures were based on figuration and expressiveness and she often left traces of her working of the material in the finished piece, in contrast to the smooth abstract work of others. In 1953 and 1956 works by her were shown at the Beaux-Arts Gallery, London. In 1953 she was one of the twelve British artists included in the international competition for the monument to the Unknown Political Prisoner Competition. Her sculpture subjects included Sandor Vegh, Herbert Read, Helen Lessore and the artists Bernard Leach, Patrick Heron and Mary Fedden. Her sculpture Three-fold Head is in the Tate collection.

As Louise Frederike Susanna Hutchinson-Wolf, she and her husband William Doge (Bill) Hutchinson (1883–1966) signed the register of Eranos conferences in 1935, 1945, 1946, 1949, 1952 and 1953.
