= Louisa Lane Clarke =

British biologist, author, and illustrator

- Born: Louisa Lane; 1812; Channel Islands
- Died: 8 November 1883 (aged 70–71); L'Hyvreuse, Saint Peter Port, Guernsey
- Known for: Plant microscopy; Travel writing

Louisa Lane Clarke (née Louisa Lane; 1812 – 8 November 1883) was a British botanist and travel writer, best known for her microscopy work on plants.

== Biography ==
Louisa Lane was born in 1812 in the Channel Islands, the eldest daughter of Ambrose Lane and Elizabeth Lane, née Le Mesurier. On 14 September 1841, Lane married the Revd. Thomas Clarke (c. 1805 – 1864), Rector of Woodeaton, Oxfordshire. They then relocated to East Bergholt, Suffolk.

Clarke wrote numerous travel guides. She is best known for her later botanical work popularizing microscopy.

Her husband died in 1864 and she relocated to Guernsey with her daughter, Theodora, by the following year. Clarke died in L'Hyvreuse, Saint Peter Port, Guernsey.

== Selected works ==
=== Travel guides ===
- Recollections and Legends of Serk
- Redstone's Guernsey Guide
- The Country Parson's Wife
- The New Parish Church of St. Ann (1850)
- The Island of Alderney

=== Scientific works ===
- The Microscope: Being a Popular Description of the Most Instructive and Beautiful Subjects for Exhibition was published in successive editions into the 1880s.
- The Common Seaweeds of the British Coast and Channel Islands; with Some Insight into the Microscopic Beauties of Their Structure and Fructification
