= Old Hall, East Bergholt =

Painting by John Constable

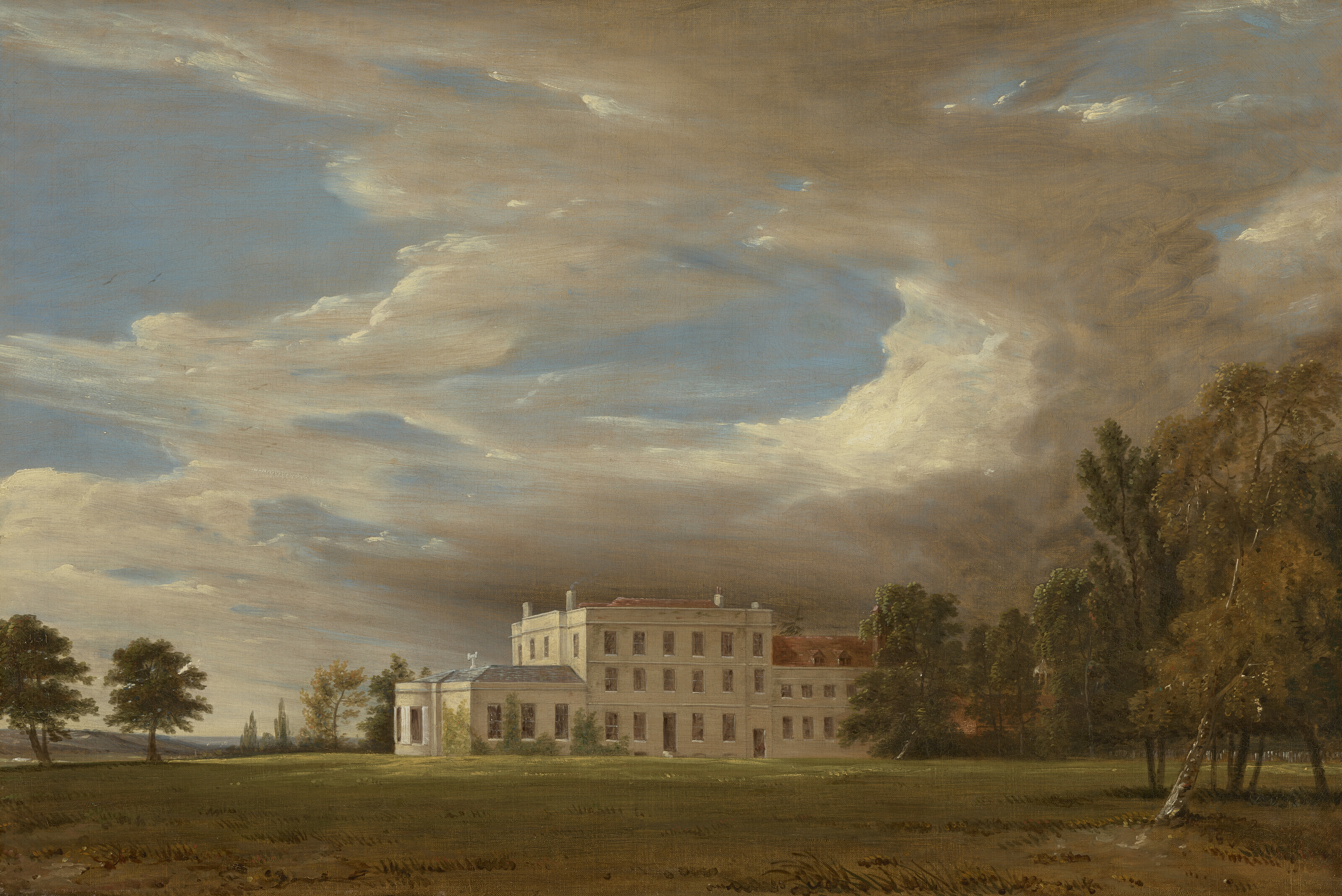
- Artist: John Constable
- Year: 1801
- Type: Oil on canvas, landscape painting
- Dimensions: 28.1 cm × 42.1 cm (11.1 in × 16.6 in)
- Location: Private collection

Old Hall, East Bergholt is an 1801 landscape painting by the British artist John Constable. Produced early in the artist's career it shows Old Hall, a country house in East Bergholt in Suffolk. Constable, a recent student at the Royal Academy Schools, was commissioned to produce the work by the property's owner John Reade. It was his first significant commission. East Bergholt was the birthplace of Constable. It appeared frequently in his paintings and is part of what is now known as Constable Country.

== See also ==
- List of paintings by John Constable

== Bibliography ==
- Boime, Albert. A Social History of Modern Art, Volume 2: Art in an Age of Bonapartism, 1800-1815. University of Chicago Press, 1993.
- Hamilton, James. Constable: A Portrait. Hachette UK, 2022.
- Reynolds, Graham. Constable's England. Metropolitan Museum of Art, 1983.
- Taylor, Basil. Constable: Paintings, Drawings and Watercolours. Phaidon, 1975.
- Venning, Barry. Constable. Parkstone International, 2015.
