= Peggy Garland =

Peggy Garland (1903 – 17 April 1998) was a portrait sculptor.

Her father was the painter, John Withycombe, and her mother was Ellen Hannah Bell. She was their second daughter, born after Elizabeth Withycombe. They grew up in East Bergholt.

== Dear Peggy ==
A book of letters to her from friends in New Zealand was published shortly before her death: Dear Peggy: letters to Margaret Garland from her New Zealand friends, edited by Peter and Diane Beatson, Massey University, 1997. The Correspondents included Rewi Alley, Elsie Beaglehole, James Bertram, Charles Brasch, Margaret Clark, Louis Johnson, Iain Lonie, Bruce Mason, Evelyn and Frederick Page, Janet Paul, Shirley Smith, Bill Sutch and Ormond Wilson.
