= Bells on Sunday =

British radio programme

Bells on Sunday is a short radio programme transmitted on BBC Radio 4. It currently airs at approximately 05:43 AM every Sunday, and is repeated at 12:45 AM the following Monday, and features bell ringers ringing the changes. The recordings come from a different church tower within the United Kingdom each week as well as from other parts of the world where full circle change ringing takes place.

New recordings can be submitted for inclusion in the programme by ringers. This is done by sending the recording to an official liaison, a volunteer bell ringer, who checks the quality of the recording, authors the accompanying draft presentation notes, submits the recordings to the BBC producers and generally liaises with the BBC.

For many years the liaison was Michael Orme of Congleton; however, since 2018 this role has been performed by his son Phillip Orme (of Cambridge Great St Mary's and also the Norman Tower Bury St. Edmunds).
