= Elizabeth Gidley Withycombe =

English writer (1902–1993)

Elizabeth Gidley Withycombe (15 June 1902 – 12 November 1993) is the compiler of The Oxford Dictionary of Christian Names, first published by the Clarendon Press in 1945 and in multiple editions since. Her name appeared as "E. G. Withycombe" in her published books.

== Early life and family ==
Elizabeth Withycombe was born in Hartley Wintney, Hampshire, on 15 June 1902. Her father was a painter, John Withycombe, and her mother was Ellen Hannah Bell. Her grandmother was Elizabeth Gidley before her marriage. Betty Withycombe had younger sisters Marjorie and Ellen Joyce. She grew up in East Bergholt, Suffolk. Her younger sister Margaret became famous as the sculptor known as Peggy Garland.

== Career ==
Withycombe worked at the Clarendon Press and helped to promote the early work of Edward Ardizzone and Iona and Peter Opie. She is best known as the compiler of The Oxford Dictionary of Christian Names, published by the Clarendon Press in 1945, and in a second edition in 1950 and a third in 1977.

== Relationship with Patrick White ==
Betty Withycombe has been described as a mentor to the Australian writer Patrick White who was her father's cousin and who stayed with the Withycombes when he was writing his first book of poems, Thirteen Poems in 1927-29 when he was aged 15–17 and she was in her mid twenties. According to White's biographer David Marr, Betty Withycombe was the first person, apart from White's mother, to encourage him to write. He described her as "a dark, severe, woman of 26" and a "tremendous bluestocking". His novel The Aunt's Story (1948) was dedicated to her. In 1977 White asked her to return the approximately 400 letters that he had sent to her, on the pretext that they would help him write The Twyburn Affair, but he subsequently burned them.

== Death and legacy ==
Withycombe died at Wyndham House in Oxford on 12 November 1993. She left an estate not exceeding £125,000.

== Selected publications ==
- A New Loggan View of the Oxford Colleges.
- Annals of English Literature, 1475-1925. The principal publications of each year, together with an alphabetical index of authors with their works. Clarendon Press, Oxford, 1935. (Compiled with Jyotiṣchandra Ghosha)
- The Oxford Dictionary of Christian Names, Clarendon Press, Oxford, 1945. (2nd 1950, 3rd 1977: also in paperback)
- Annals of English Literature, 1475-1950. The principal publications of each year, together with an alphabetical index of authors with their works, Clarendon Press, Oxford, 1961. (Compiled with Jyotiṣchandra Ghosha, updated by R. W. Chapman)
