= East Bergholt =

Village in Suffolk, England

Coordinates: 51.978°N 1.017°E

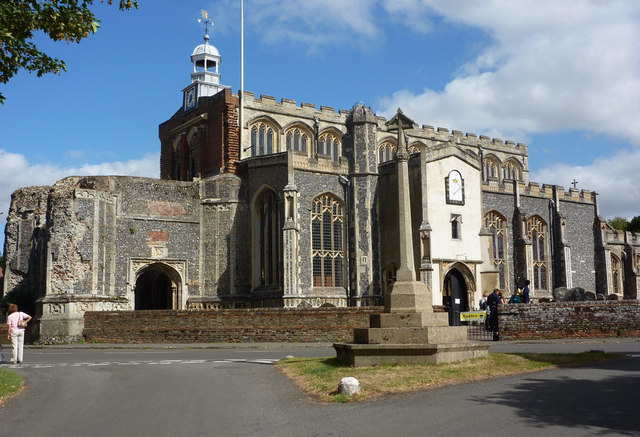
- Church of St Mary the Virgin

- Location within Suffolk
- Population: 2,765 (Including Flatford 2011 Census)
- OS grid reference: TM072351
- District: Babergh
- Shire county: Suffolk
- Region: East
- Country: England
- Sovereign state: United Kingdom
- Post town: COLCHESTER
- Postcode district: CO7
- Dialling code: 01206
- Police: Suffolk
- Fire: Suffolk
- Ambulance: East of England
- UK Parliament: South Suffolk

East Bergholt is a village in the Babergh District of Suffolk, England, just north of the Essex border.

The nearest town and railway station is Manningtree, Essex. East Bergholt is ten miles (16 kilometres) north of Colchester and eight miles (13 kilometres) south of Ipswich. Schools include East Bergholt High School, a comprehensive for children aged 11–16, and a primary school.

During the 16th century, its inhabitants became well known for Protestant radicalism. A few of its citizens were martyred during the reign of Queen Mary I, and the Protestant martyrologist John Foxe recorded their stories in his famous work Acts and Monuments (also known as Foxe's Book of Martyrs).

East Bergholt is the birthplace of painter John Constable whose father owned Flatford Mill. Flatford and Dedham, Essex, both made famous by John Constable, are within walking distance of East Bergholt.

== St Mary's Church and bell cage ==
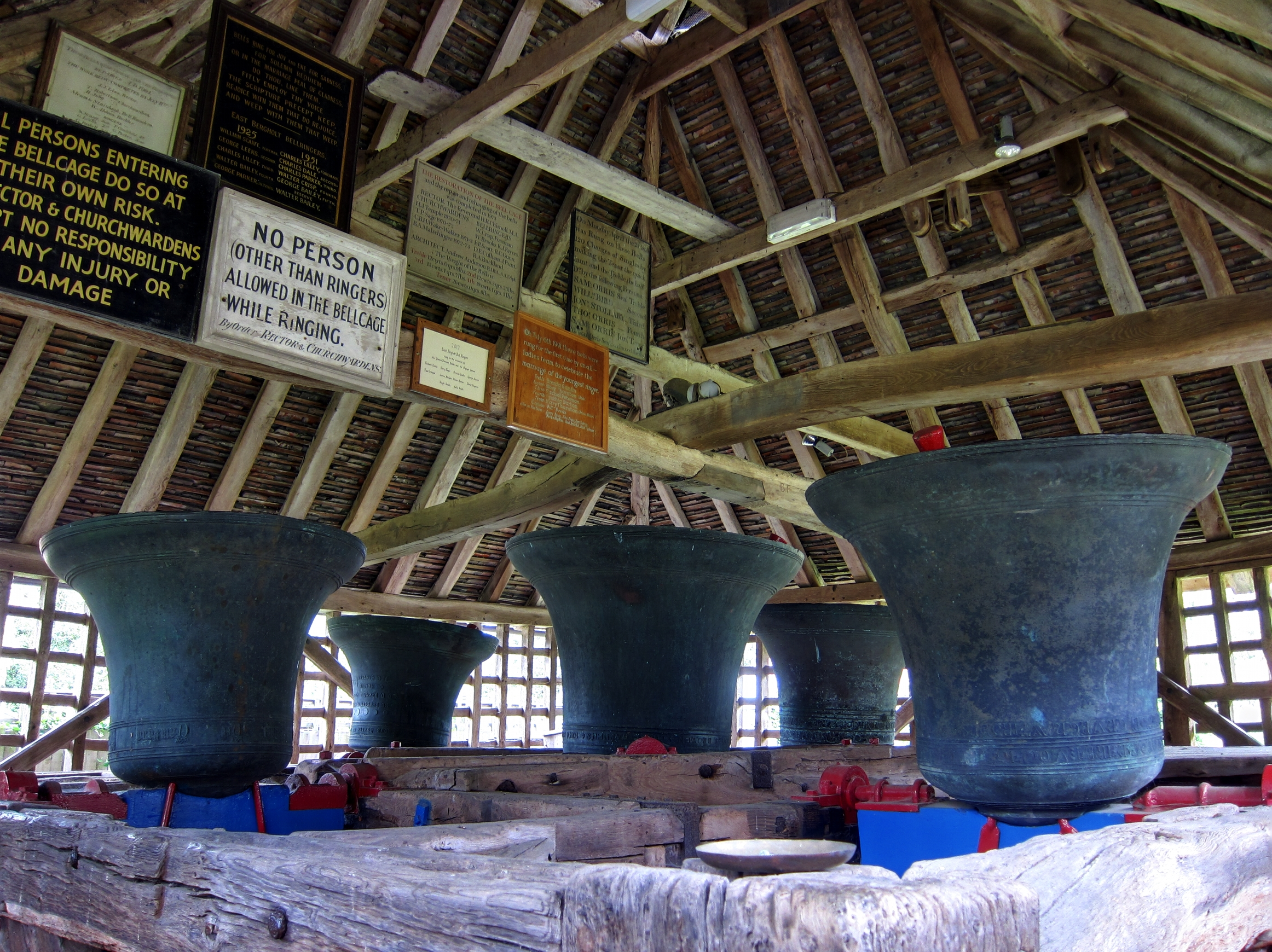
Bellcage of St. Mary's Church

The Church of St Mary the Virgin was built in the 15th and 16th centuries, but is well known for the absence of a tower or spire to house the bells. Work began on a tower in 1525, but Cardinal Wolsey's fall from grace in 1530 brought construction to a halt and the following year a wooden bell cage was erected in the churchyard. The Bell Cage was built as a temporary structure to house the bells until the tower could be built. It still exists and now houses the set of 5 bells, although it is possible the tenor, which weighs 1 ton 6 cwt 0 qr 8 lb (1,320 kg) and has a diameter 4 ft 6 in (137 cm), was added in 1691. There are rumors the Bell Cage was moved from its original position in the 17th century because the occupant of Old Hall objected to the noise of the bells. The only evidence for this is a 1731 hand-drawn map on vellum that shows the Bell Cage situated to the East of the Church.

The bells are exceptional in that they are not rung from below by ropes attached to wheels, as is usual in change ringing, but the headstock is manipulated by hand by ringers standing beside the bells. The bells are believed to be the heaviest five (A, G, F♯, E, and D) that are rung in England today, with a total weight of 4 1/4 long tons (4,300 kg).

== Other important buildings ==
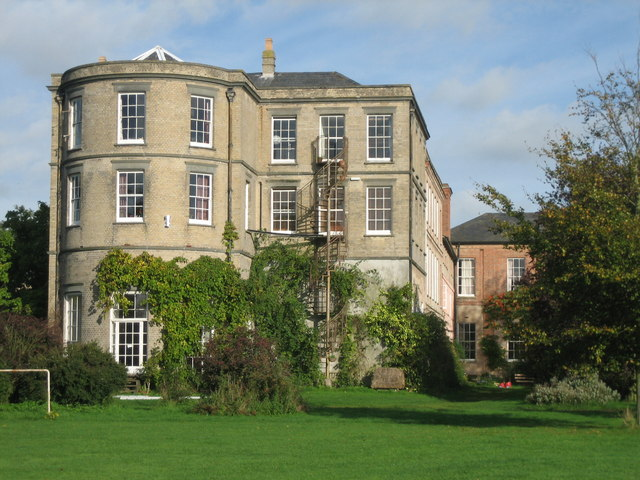
Old Hall, south facade

Old Hall, East Bergholt by John Constable, 1801

- Old Hall has been a manor house, nunnery, army barracks and friary. It now houses the Old Hall Community, a single household of about 60 people who live co-operatively and farm organically.
- Lambe School, a Grade II listed building, now the village hall, was founded 1594 by Edward Lambe.
- East Bergholt Lodge, a Grade II listed property originally built in the 16th century, was for many generations the home of the Hughes and Wake-Walker families.
- East Bergholt Place, home of the Eley family and the garden centre The Place for Plants, is noted for its camellias.
- Stour House was once the home of Randolph Churchill, son of the Prime Minister Winston Churchill.
- Bridge Cottage is a 16th-century cottage used as a location by John Constable.

== Governance ==
The parish of East Bergholt is its own electoral ward as part of Babergh District council and is part of the Samford division of Suffolk County Council. The village has its own parish council made up of 13 councillors. The village is twinned with the village of Barbizon in France.

As with some other English towns and villages located on the border of two counties, the postal address and postcode of East Bergholt is actually linked to Colchester which is in Essex. East Bergholt also has Colchester (“CO…”) postcodes despite it (East Bergholt) actually being in Suffolk.

== Climate ==
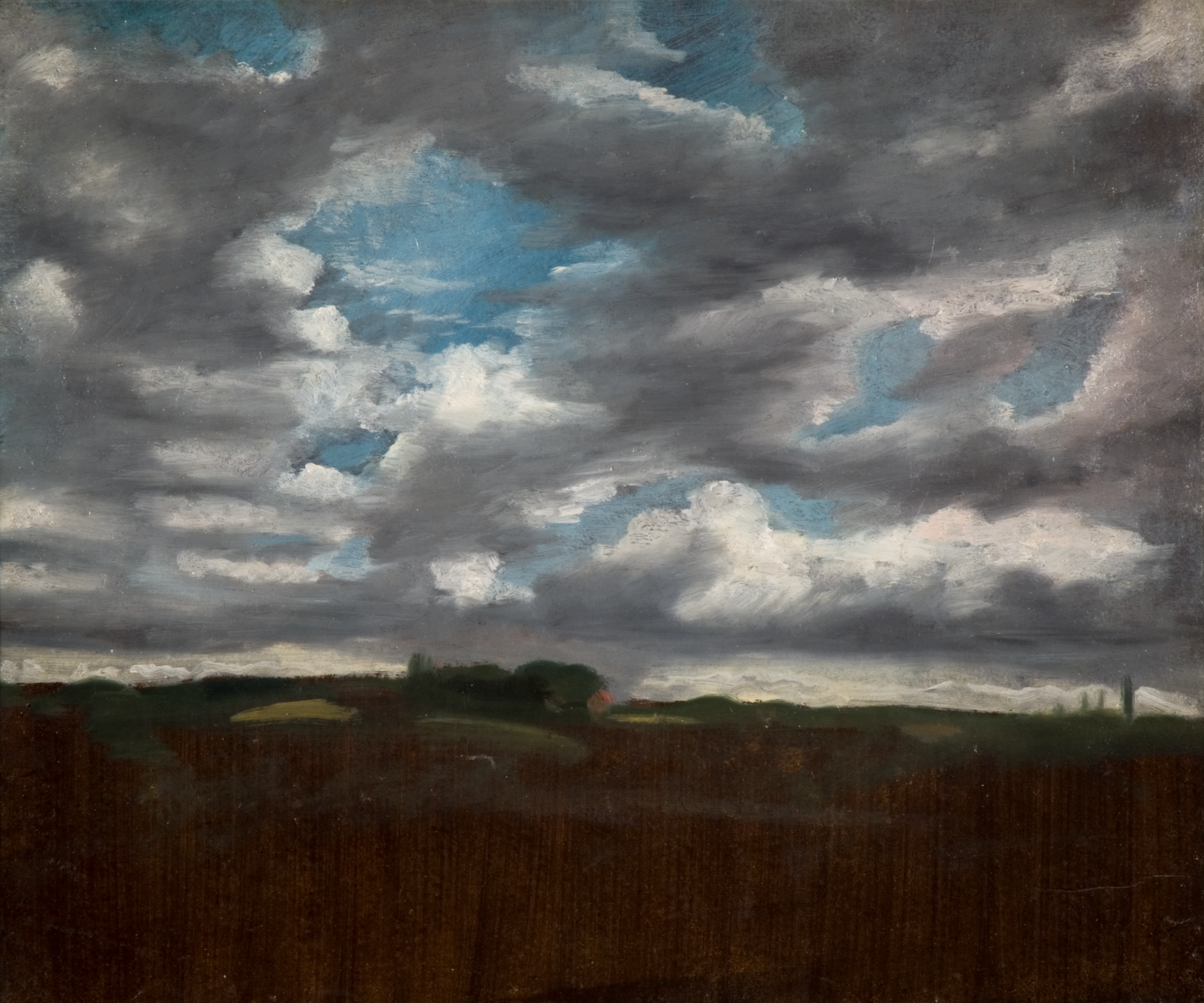
Landscape with Clouds, John Constable, (c.1820 - c.1822), features the rectory at East Bergholt

East Bergholt has a weather station for which data is available. The village experiences a maritime climate with a narrow range of temperature and rainfall spread evenly throughout the year. See Ipswich Climate data.

== Amenities ==
The East Bergholt Dramatic Society was established in the 1960s. Lady Anne Wake-Walker was president until the 1990s, and was succeeded by her daughter. The group, with about 20 members, meets regularly at the Constable Memorial Hall.

== Housing development ==
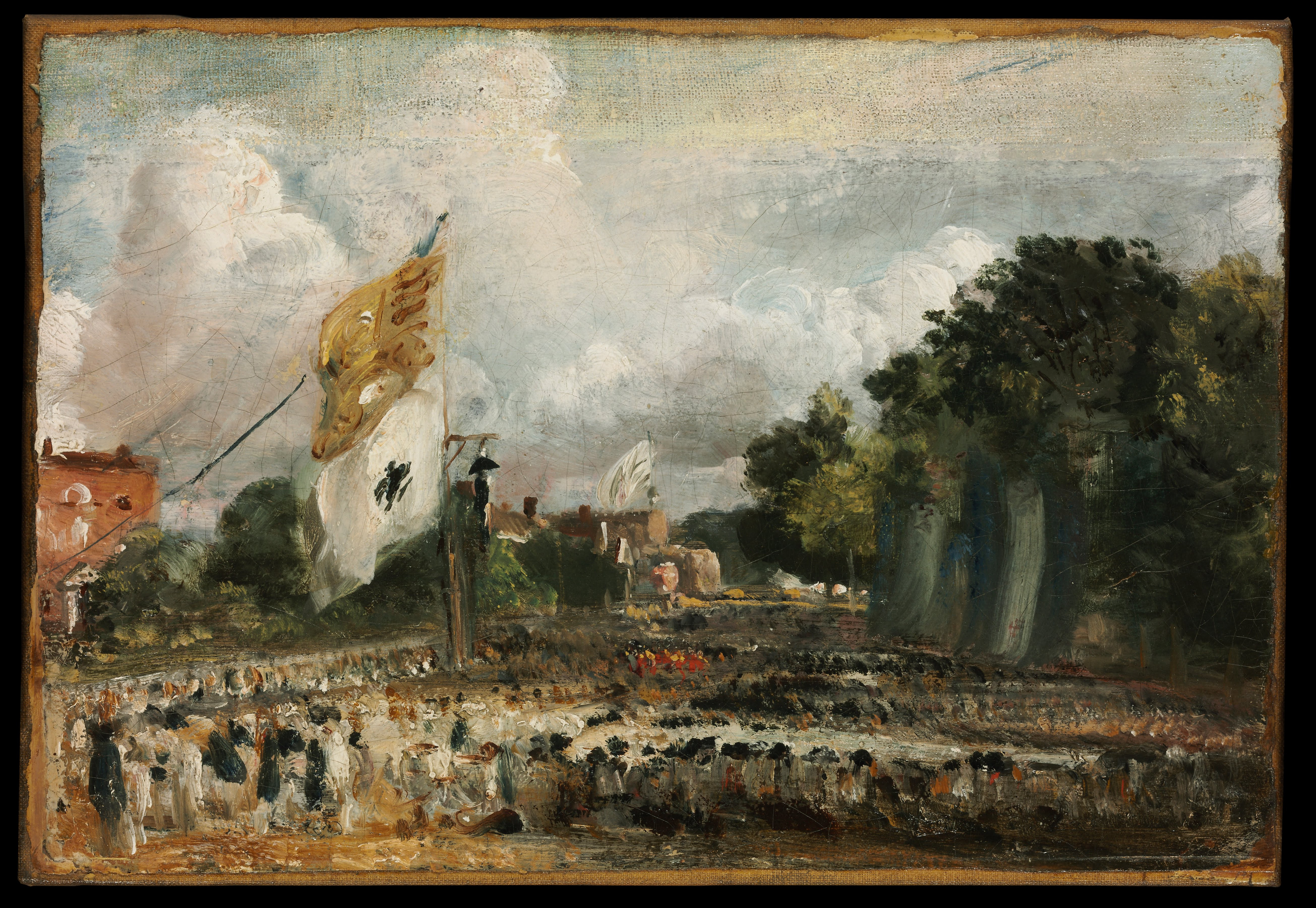
The Celebration in East Bergholt of the Peace of 1814 by Constable depicts the public jubilee in the village to celebrate the defeat of Napoleon.

In 2014 plans were drawn up for a new 144 housing estate in the north of the village. Local residents responded by erecting multiple signs around the village campaigning for a "No" decision by Babergh District Council. In March 2016, Babergh District Council approved the plans for a new housing development, despite strong opposition from Action East Bergholt Group and many concerned residents. As a result, in April 2017 residents were reported to be considering a fight to become part of neighbouring Essex county rather than the current county of Suffolk.

Despite earlier strong opposition to any large developments within East Bergholt, the parish council has given its support to a large quasi-commercial development within East End, East Bergholt. Thereby exposing itself to future large developments within the village.

== Notable residents ==
- Robert Samuel (d. 1555), clergyman
- Sir Richard Hughes, 1st Baronet (1708–1779), naval officer
- Sir Richard Hughes, 2nd Baronet (1729–1812), naval officer
- John Constable (1776–1837), landscape painter
- William Branwhite Clarke (1798–1878), geologist and clergyman
- Charles David Badham (1805–1857), clergyman and physician
- Louisa Lane Clarke (1812–1883), botanist and travel writer
- Joseph Woolley (1815–1892), clergyman
- George Nelson Godwin (1846–1907), clergyman and antiquarian
- Charles Edward Mallows (1864–1915), architect
- Bernard Halley Stewart (1874–1958), physician
- Li Osborne (1883–1968), photographer and sculptor
- Frederic Wake-Walker (1888–1945), naval officer, who is buried at East Bergholt cemetery
- Lucy Harwood (1893–1972), artist
- Maxwell Eley (1902–1983), rower and businessman
- Betty Withycombe (1902–1993), author
- Peggy Garland (1903–1998), sculptor
- Geoffrey Eley (1904–1990), businessman and author
- Randolph Churchill (1911-1968), journalist, writer and politician
- Paul Jennings (1918–1989), author
- Paul Quail (1928–2010), stained-glass artist
- Paul Goddard (b. 1959), footballer
- Sarah Raphael (1960–2001), artist
- Paul Curry (b. 1961), golfer
