= List of listed buildings in Arrochar, Argyll =

This is a list of listed buildings in the parish of Arrochar in Argyll and Bute, Scotland.

== List ==
Name	Location	Date listed	Geo-coordinates	Notes	Category	LB number	Image
Arrochar, Glenloin House With Ice House And Gatepiers			56°12′26″N 4°44′32″W		C(S)	43182	Upload Photo
Arrochar, Mansefield			56°11′36″N 4°45′02″W		B	43184	Upload Photo
Ballyhennan, The Black Sheep Arts And Crafts Centre			56°12′11″N 4°43′13″W		C(S)	43185	Upload another image
Arrochar Parish Church			56°11′41″N 4°44′53″W		B	826	Upload another image See more images
Arrochar, Claymore Hotel (Former Inverioch Or Arrochar House (Including Gatepiers)			56°11′50″N 4°44′50″W		B	829	Upload Photo
Stuckgowan House			56°11′21″N 4°42′03″W		A	861	Upload Photo
Arrochar, Invereoch			56°11′38″N 4°45′01″W		C(S)	43183	Upload Photo
Sloy Awe Hydro Electric Scheme, Sloy Power Station Including Boundary Walls, Gates And Gatepiers			56°15′40″N 4°45′52″W		A	43188	Upload another image See more images
Arrochar, Old Parish Church			56°11′41″N 4°44′53″W		B	825	Upload another image
Arrochar, Church Road, The Steadings			56°11′46″N 4°44′41″W		C(S)	830	Upload Photo
Tarbet Hotel			56°12′13″N 4°42′40″W		B	832	Upload another image
Creag-An-Arnain Railway Viaduct			56°15′30″N 4°42′34″W		B	864	Upload Photo
Ardlui Railway Station Building with Subway and Gates			56°18′07″N 4°43′19″W		C(S)	43177	Upload another image See more images
Inveruglas Barn			56°14′51″N 4°42′50″W		C(S)	43186	Upload Photo
Arrochar and Tarbet Station, With Control Box, Subway And Gates			56°12′11″N 4°43′26″W		B	865	Upload another image See more images
Ardmay House With Gatepiers			56°11′11″N 4°46′08″W		C(S)	43179	Upload another image
Inveruglas Steading			56°14′49″N 4°42′50″W		C(S)	43187	Upload Photo
Ballyhennan, Burial Ground, Monuments And Boundary Wall			56°12′12″N 4°43′14″W		C(S)	827	Upload another image See more images
Edendarroch House			56°12′01″N 4°42′26″W		C(S)	831	Upload Photo
Stuckgowan Cottage			56°11′19″N 4°41′55″W		C(S)	863	Upload another image
Ardlui, Former Station Master's House			56°18′09″N 4°43′18″W		C(S)	43178	Upload Photo
Sloy Power Station, Bungalow			56°15′00″N 4°42′43″W		C(S)	43190	Upload Photo
Tarbet, Lochview And Post Office			56°12′16″N 4°42′44″W		C(S)	820	Upload another image
Stuckgowan House, North Lodge, Walled Garden And Kennels/Stables			56°11′24″N 4°42′00″W		B	862	Upload Photo
Sloy Awe Hydro Electric Scheme, Loch Sloy Dam			56°15′42″N 4°45′48″W		B	51712	Upload another image See more images
Arrochar, Fascadail			56°11′43″N 4°44′50″W		C(S)	43181	Upload Photo
Arrochar, Lynwood Hotel (Formerly Oaklands Hotel)			56°11′35″N 4°45′06″W		C(S)	828	Upload Photo
Ardlui, K6 Telephone Box			56°18′07″N 4°43′15″W		B	866	Upload another image
Arrochar, Cobbler Cottage			56°11′49″N 4°44′49″W		B	43180	Upload Photo
Sloy Power Station, Bridge			56°14′59″N 4°42′42″W		C(S)	43189	Upload Photo

== Key ==
The scheme for classifying buildings in Scotland is:

- Category A: "buildings of national or international importance, either architectural or historic; or fine, little-altered examples of some particular period, style or building type."
- Category B: "buildings of regional or more than local importance; or major examples of some particular period, style or building type, which may have been altered."
- Category C: "buildings of local importance; lesser examples of any period, style, or building type, as originally constructed or moderately altered; and simple traditional buildings which group well with other listed buildings."

In March 2016 there were 47,288 listed buildings in Scotland. Of these, 8% were Category A, and 50% were Category B, with the remaining 42% being Category C.

== See also ==
- List of listed buildings in Argyll and Bute
