= List of listed buildings in Kilfinan, Argyll and Bute =

This is a list of listed buildings in the parish of Kilfinan in Argyll and Bute, Scotland.

== List ==
Name	Location	Date listed	Grid ref. (Note: Sometimes known as OSGB36, the grid reference (where provided) is based on the British national grid reference system used by the Ordnance Survey. • "Guide to National Grid". Ordnance Survey. • "Get-a-map". Ordnance Survey.)	Geo-coordinates	Notes	LB number (Note: Historic Environment Scotland assign a unique alphanumeric identifier to each designated site in Scotland, for listed buildings this always begins with "LB", for example "LB12345".)	Image
Tighnabruaich Parish Church Church Of Scotland				55°54′27″N 5°13′57″W	Category B	13308	Upload Photo
Ballimore Estate, Barnlongart Including Ancillary Structure				55°59′38″N 5°19′58″W	Category C(S)	47128	Upload Photo
Rankin Of Otter Burial Place				55°57′29″N 5°18′40″W	Category B	13802	Upload Photo
Ferry-House Otter Ferry				56°00′29″N 5°19′18″W	Category C(S)	12051	Upload Photo
Tighnabruaich Pier				55°54′37″N 5°13′26″W	Category B	13467	Upload Photo
Ardmarnock House				55°54′13″N 5°20′05″W	Category B	12081	Upload Photo
Kilbride Church Of Scotland				55°51′50″N 5°15′31″W	Category B	12083	Upload Photo
Ardlamont House				55°50′32″N 5°13′35″W	Category B	12046	Upload Photo
Tighnabruaich Parish Church Manse				55°54′27″N 5°13′56″W	Category C(S)	13309	Upload Photo
Acharossan House				55°56′28″N 5°18′10″W	Category C(S)	12080	Upload Photo
Otter Ferry Quay				56°00′32″N 5°19′18″W	Category C(S)	12050	Upload Photo
Kilfinan Parish Church				55°57′31″N 5°18′39″W	Category B	12079	Upload Photo
Ardlamont Square				55°50′38″N 5°13′31″W	Category B	12048	Upload Photo
Castle Ascog, By Ascog Loch (Achoire)				55°53′02″N 5°17′05″W	Category B	12082	Upload Photo
Sundial, Walled Garden, Ardlamont				55°50′34″N 5°13′32″W	Category B	12047	Upload Photo
Ballimore House				55°59′52″N 5°19′53″W	Category B	12049	Upload Photo

== Key ==
The scheme for classifying buildings in Scotland is:

- Category A: "buildings of national or international importance, either architectural or historic; or fine, little-altered examples of some particular period, style or building type."
- Category B: "buildings of regional or more than local importance; or major examples of some particular period, style or building type, which may have been altered."
- Category C: "buildings of local importance; lesser examples of any period, style, or building type, as originally constructed or moderately altered; and simple traditional buildings which group well with other listed buildings."

In March 2016 there were 47,288 listed buildings in Scotland. Of these, 8% were Category A, and 50% were Category B, with the remaining 42% being Category C.

== See also ==
- List of listed buildings in Argyll and Bute
