= List of listed buildings in Kilbrandon And Kilchattan, Argyll and Bute =

This is a list of listed buildings in the parish of Kilbrandon and Kilchattan in Argyll and Bute, Scotland. It includes part of Lorne, and the islands of Seil, Easdale and Luing.

== List ==
Name	Location	Date Listed	Grid Ref. (Note: Sometimes known as OSGB36, the grid reference (where provided) is based on the British national grid reference system used by the Ordnance Survey. • "Guide to National Grid". Ordnance Survey. • "Get-a-map". Ordnance Survey.)	Geo-coordinates	Notes	LB Number (Note: Historic Environment Scotland assign a unique alphanumeric identifier to each designated site in Scotland, for listed buildings this always begins with "LB", for example "LB12345".)	Image
Ellanbeich, Comprising:- 1-24. Miss Campbell's Cottage, Harbour Tea Room (The Old Bakery), Shop,26,27 (Mr Connely's Cottage And Post Office) 28-42. Smith's Garage (Former Store-House) 61,60 Sealladh-Na-Mara 64 (The Old Inn) Monaveen Lodge	Seil			56°17′39″N 5°38′55″W	Category B	12425	Upload Photo
Toberonochy Comprising:- 1 (Seabank) 4, 5, 6, 7; 14, 15, 16; 18, 19, 20, 21, 22; 26 (Sherbrooke Cottage); 27, 28; 29; 30; 31, 32; Village Hall; 33; 34-35, 36, 37-38; 39, 40, 41, 42; Arizona Villa	Luing			56°13′04″N 5°37′58″W	Category B	12198	Upload Photo
Luing Island Toberonochy Quay	Luing			56°12′58″N 5°37′46″W	Category C(S)	12199	Upload Photo
Luing, 3 K6 Telephone Kiosks	Luing			56°15′57″N 5°37′56″W	Category B	12202	Upload Photo
Ardmaddy Castle	Lorne			56°17′19″N 5°34′45″W	Category B	12226	Upload another image See more images
Kilbrandon House	Seil			56°16′43″N 5°36′38″W	Category B	12230	Upload Photo
8, 100 And 6 Easdale Island	Easdale			56°17′30″N 5°39′16″W	Category C(S)	48056	Upload Photo
9 Easdale Island	Easdale			56°17′30″N 5°39′17″W	Category C(S)	48058	Upload Photo
34 And 35 Easdale Island	Easdale			56°17′28″N 5°39′23″W	Category C(S)	48069	Upload Photo
41, 42, 43 Easdale Island	Easdale			56°17′30″N 5°39′24″W	Category C(S)	48070	Upload Photo
47 Easdale Island	Easdale			56°17′31″N 5°39′25″W	Category C(S)	48085	Upload Photo
Cullipool, Comprising: Cullipool House 3,4,5,6,8,9,10,11,15,16,17,21,22,18,19,20,24,25,26,28,29,31,32,33,36,37,38,39, 40,41,42,43,44,45,47, Former St Peter's Episcopal Church	Luing			56°15′23″N 5°39′02″W	Category B	12424	Upload another image
Old Kilchattan Kirk Graveyard, including Boundary Wall (excluding Old Parish Church of Kilchattan)	Luing			56°13′15″N 5°38′22″W	Category B	12196	Upload another image See more images
Ellenbeich Quay At Sgeir Nam Ban And Sea Wall To South	Seil			56°17′36″N 5°39′04″W	Category B	12201	Upload Photo
2, 3, 4 And 5 Easdale Island, Including Garden Walls To Rear	Easdale			56°17′30″N 5°39′14″W	Category C(S)	48055	Upload Photo
Luing Island, Cullipool Quay	Luing			56°15′06″N 5°39′16″W	Category B	12200	Upload another image
Ardincaple House	Seil			56°18′49″N 5°37′02″W	Category B	12228	Upload Photo
12 And 12A Easdale Island	Easdale			56°17′28″N 5°39′16″W	Category C(S)	48060	Upload Photo
29 Easdale Island Including Garden Wall To Rear	Easdale			56°17′27″N 5°39′15″W	Category C(S)	48065	Upload Photo
50, 51, 52, 53 And 54 Easdale Island	Easdale			56°17′32″N 5°39′25″W	Category C(S)	48077	Upload Photo
Ellanabeich K6 Telephone Kiosk	Seil			56°17′41″N 5°38′59″W	Category B	12203	Upload Photo
Tigh-An-Truish Hotel	Seil			56°19′04″N 5°35′04″W	Category C(S)	12227	Upload another image See more images
Ardlarach Farmhouse	Luing			56°13′10″N 5°39′14″W	Category B	12197	Upload Photo
13 Easdale Island	Easdale			56°17′28″N 5°39′16″W	Category C(S)	48061	Upload Photo
15 Easdale Island	Easdale			56°17′28″N 5°39′19″W	Category C(S)	48063	Upload Photo
32, 18 And 19 Easdale Island Including Garden Walls To Rear	Easdale			56°17′29″N 5°39′20″W	Category C(S)	48064	Upload Photo
31, 33A And 33 Easdale Island	Easdale			56°17′28″N 5°39′21″W	Category C(S)	48068	Upload Photo
Old Kilbrandon And Kilchattan Kirk North Cuan	Seil			56°16′07″N 5°37′43″W	Category C(S)	12195	Upload Photo
Luing, Achafolla Mill	Luing			56°13′45″N 5°38′35″W	Category C(S)	47129	Upload another image See more images
Easdale Island, Harbour Breastwork	Easdale			56°17′32″N 5°39′20″W	Category B	48053	Upload Photo
Easdale Island, The Drill Hall	Easdale			56°17′31″N 5°39′16″W	Category C(S)	48057	Upload Photo
11, 11A, 11B Easdale Island	Easdale			56°17′29″N 5°39′15″W	Category C(S)	48059	Upload Photo
23 Easdale Island	Easdale			56°17′29″N 5°39′20″W	Category C(S)	48066	Upload Photo
55 Easdale Island Including Boundary Wall	Easdale			56°17′33″N 5°39′25″W	Category C(S)	48076	Upload Photo
Kilbrandon And Kilchattan Kirk	Seil			56°16′45″N 5°37′26″W	Category C(S)	12229	Upload another image See more images
1 Easdale Island	Easdale			56°17′31″N 5°39′13″W	Category C(S)	48054	Upload Photo
24 Easdale Island	Easdale			56°17′30″N 5°39′20″W	Category C(S)	48067	Upload Photo
44 Easdale Island	Easdale			56°17′30″N 5°39′25″W	Category C(S)	48071	Upload Photo
48 Easdale Island	Easdale			56°17′31″N 5°39′25″W	Category C(S)	48073	Upload Photo
36 Easdale Island	Easdale			56°17′28″N 5°39′23″W	Category C(S)	48074	Upload Photo
The Coalery, Easdale Island	Easdale			56°17′32″N 5°39′24″W	Category C(S)	48075	Upload Photo

== Key ==
The scheme for classifying buildings in Scotland is:

- Category A: "buildings of national or international importance, either architectural or historic; or fine, little-altered examples of some particular period, style or building type."
- Category B: "buildings of regional or more than local importance; or major examples of some particular period, style or building type, which may have been altered."
- Category C: "buildings of local importance; lesser examples of any period, style, or building type, as originally constructed or moderately altered; and simple traditional buildings which group well with other listed buildings."

In March 2016 there were 47,288 listed buildings in Scotland. Of these, 8% were Category A, and 50% were Category B, with the remaining 42% being Category C.

== See also ==
- List of listed buildings in Argyll and Bute
