= List of listed buildings in Kingarth =

This is a list of listed buildings in the parish of Kingarth in Argyll and Bute, Scotland.

== List ==
Name	Location	Date Listed	Grid Ref. (Note: Sometimes known as OSGB36, the grid reference (where provided) is based on the British national grid reference system used by the Ordnance Survey. • "Guide to National Grid". Ordnance Survey. • "Get-a-map". Ordnance Survey.)	Geo-coordinates	Notes	LB Number (Note: Historic Environment Scotland assign a unique alphanumeric identifier to each designated site in Scotland, for listed buildings this always begins with "LB", for example "LB12345".)	Image
Ascog, Millbank House Including Boundary Wall, Gatepiers, Gates And Terrace Fence				55°49′54″N 5°01′34″W	Category B	44990	Upload Photo
Ascog, The Old Manse Including Boundary Wall And Gatepiers				55°49′33″N 5°01′28″W	Category C(S)	44994	Upload Photo
7 And 8 Kerrycroy Village Including Outbuilding And Boundary Walls				55°48′30″N 5°01′22″W	Category B	45001	Upload Photo
Kingarth, The Old Schoolhouse Including Boundary Wall				55°45′47″N 5°02′21″W	Category C(S)	45014	Upload Photo
Mount Stuart, Kennels, Including Boundary Walls And Railings				55°47′32″N 5°01′21″W	Category B	45023	Upload Photo
Mount Stuart, Old School House Including Boundary Wall				55°48′12″N 5°01′32″W	Category C(S)	45029	Upload Photo
Mount Stuart House				55°47′30″N 5°01′07″W	Category A	12052	Upload another image
Mount Stuart, Monument				55°47′35″N 5°01′03″W	Category B	12053	Upload another image
Mount Stuart, Kerrylamont Farm Dairy				55°46′59″N 5°00′56″W	Category A	12056	Upload another image
Ascog, Ascog Hall Including Garden Arch And Boundary Wall				55°49′22″N 5°01′29″W	Category B	12064	Upload Photo
Ascog, Boat House				55°49′30″N 5°01′20″W	Category C(S)	44986	Upload Photo
Ascog, Entrance Gate, The Railway Convalescent Home				55°49′24″N 5°01′23″W	Category C(S)	44987	Upload Photo
Ascog, Meikle Ascog Including Gatepiers				55°49′27″N 5°01′39″W	Category B	44989	Upload Photo
Ascog, Southpark Including Former Coach-House, Boundary Walls And Gatepiers				55°49′19″N 5°01′29″W	Category B	44996	Upload Photo
5 And 6 Kerrycroy Village Including Boundary Walls				55°48′31″N 5°01′23″W	Category B	45000	Upload Photo
10 Kerrycroy Village Including Boundary Walls				55°48′29″N 5°01′21″W	Category B	45002	Upload Photo
11 And 12 Kerrycroy Village Including Boundary Walls				55°48′28″N 5°01′20″W	Category B	45003	Upload Photo
Kilchattan Bay, Quay				55°45′04″N 5°01′25″W	Category C(S)	45008	Upload Photo
Kingarth, Brick Cottage And Roselea Including Outbuilding				55°45′45″N 5°02′06″W	Category C(S)	45010	Upload Photo
Kingarth, Bruchag Road, The Manse Including Courtyard Range, Walled Garden, Boundary Wall, Gatepiers And Gates				55°45′54″N 5°01′55″W	Category C(S)	45011	Upload Photo
Mount Stuart, Kerrylamont Farmhouse And Outbuildings				55°46′59″N 5°00′56″W	Category B	45025	Upload Photo
Mount Stuart, Kerrylamont Gatelodge, Off Bruchag Road				55°46′48″N 5°00′46″W	Category C(S)	45026	Upload Photo
Mount Stuart, South Lodge Including Outbuilding, Boundary Wall And Gates				55°47′10″N 5°01′05″W	Category C(S)	45030	Upload Photo
Kerrycroy, Quay Including Bridge				55°48′29″N 5°01′13″W	Category B	12059	Upload Photo
Ascog, Former Saltpan				55°49′35″N 5°01′21″W	Category B	12065	Upload Photo
Kilchattan Bay, Ashgrove And Hazelbank Including Boundary Wall And Gatepiers				55°44′56″N 5°01′18″W	Category C(S)	45006	Upload Photo
Kingarth, Langalchorad Cottages Including Outbuilding				55°45′46″N 5°02′14″W	Category C(S)	45012	Upload Photo
Mount Stuart, Mausoleum And Graveyard				55°48′05″N 5°01′00″W	Category A	12055	Upload Photo
1 Kerrycroy Village Including Boundary Walls				55°48′33″N 5°01′22″W	Category B	12057	Upload Photo
Ascog, Ascog House Including Tower, Outbuilding, Garage And Garden Wall				55°49′24″N 5°01′39″W	Category B	12061	Upload Photo
Ascog, Ascog House, Pink Lodge Including Boundary Walls And Gatepiers				55°49′35″N 5°01′29″W	Category C(S)	44983	Upload Photo
13 And 14 Kerrycroy Village Including Boundary Wall				55°48′28″N 5°01′18″W	Category B	45004	Upload Photo
Kilchattan Bay, St Blane's Hotel Including Boundary Wall				55°45′00″N 5°01′25″W	Category C(S)	45009	Upload Photo
Kingarth Langalchorad Farmhouse Including Outbuilding And Boundary Wall				55°45′47″N 5°02′29″W	Category C(S)	45013	Upload Photo
Lubas Farm Including Outbuildings And Boundary Wall				55°44′48″N 5°02′58″W	Category C(S)	45016	Upload Photo
Mount Stuart, Beehive Well				55°47′56″N 5°01′11″W	Category C(S)	45017	Upload another image
Mount Stuart, Laundry Cottage And Store				55°47′29″N 5°01′11″W	Category C(S)	45027	Upload Photo
Ascog, Balmory Road, Balmory House (Former Laidlaw Memorial Home) Including Boundary Walls And Gatepiers				55°49′17″N 5°01′42″W	Category A	44984	Upload Photo
Ascog, St Margaret's				55°49′09″N 5°01′33″W	Category B	44995	Upload Photo
Ascog, Southpark Lodge				55°49′20″N 5°01′26″W	Category C(S)	44997	Upload Photo
3 And 4 Kerrycroy Village Including Boundary Walls				55°48′32″N 5°01′23″W	Category B	44999	Upload Photo
Kilchattan Bay, Kingarth And Kilchattan Bay Church Of Scotland, Including Boundary Wall And Gatepiers				55°45′08″N 5°01′44″W	Category C(S)	45007	Upload Photo
Mount Stuart, East Lodge Including Outbuilding				55°47′52″N 5°00′51″W	Category C(S)	45019	Upload Photo
Mount Stuart, Heather Lodge				55°48′16″N 5°01′33″W	Category C(S)	45021	Upload Photo
Mount Stuart, North Lodge Including Outbuilding, Gatepiers, Gates, Estate Boundary Walls And Railings				55°48′27″N 5°01′17″W	Category B	12058	Upload Photo
Ascog, Ascog Hall Fernery				55°49′22″N 5°01′29″W	Category B	44982	Upload Photo
Ascog, The Hermitage Including Summerhouse				55°48′49″N 5°01′26″W	Category C(S)	44988	Upload Photo
Ascog, 1 And 2 Millburn Cottages Including Front Wall And Gatepiers				55°49′56″N 5°01′37″W	Category C(S)	44992	Upload Photo
Kingarth, The Tileries Including Outbuildings And Boundary Wall				55°45′43″N 5°02′00″W	Category C(S)	45015	Upload Photo
Mount Stuart, Blackwood Cottage				55°48′04″N 5°01′31″W	Category C(S)	45018	Upload Photo
Mount Stuart, Game Larder				55°47′27″N 5°01′11″W	Category B	45020	Upload Photo
Mount Stuart, Sundial				55°47′16″N 5°01′07″W	Category B	12054	Upload Photo
St Blane's Church Including Graveyard, Cauldron And Boundary Wall				55°44′13″N 5°02′10″W	Category A	12063	Upload another image
Ascog, Balmory Road, Balmory House (Former Laidlaw Memorial Home), Gatelodge				55°49′19″N 5°01′34″W	Category C(S)	44985	Upload Photo
Glencallum Bay, Ruvha'An Eun Minor Light				55°43′48″N 5°00′14″W	Category C(S)	44998	Upload Photo
Ascog, Agnes Patrick Guest House Including Boundary Wall And Gatepiers				55°49′46″N 5°01′31″W	Category C(S)	44981	Upload Photo
Ascog, Millbank Stables, Coach-House And Dower House Including Boundary Wall, Gatepiers And Courtyard				55°49′54″N 5°01′33″W	Category C(S)	44991	Upload Photo
Ascog, Millburn House Including Boundary Wall				55°49′57″N 5°01′33″W	Category B	44993	Upload Photo
Mount Stuart, Kennel Cottages Including Boundary Wall				55°47′31″N 5°01′17″W	Category C(S)	45022	Upload Photo
Mount Stuart, Kerrylamont Cottage, Off Bruchag Road, Including Railings, Gatepiers And Gates				55°47′02″N 5°01′22″W	Category C(S)	45024	Upload Photo
Mount Stuart, Former Meat Store				55°47′26″N 5°01′09″W	Category C(S)	45028	Upload Photo
Mount Stuart, Scoulag (West) Lodge Including Entrance Forecourt				55°47′36″N 5°01′55″W	Category B	13800	Upload Photo
Ascog, Ascog Church Including Boundary Wall And Piers				55°49′34″N 5°01′20″W	Category B	12060	Upload Photo
Ascog, Ascogbank Including Boundary Walls And Gatepiers				55°49′39″N 5°01′34″W	Category B	12062	Upload Photo

== Key ==
The scheme for classifying buildings in Scotland is:

- Category A: "buildings of national or international importance, either architectural or historic; or fine, little-altered examples of some particular period, style or building type."
- Category B: "buildings of regional or more than local importance; or major examples of some particular period, style or building type, which may have been altered."
- Category C: "buildings of local importance; lesser examples of any period, style, or building type, as originally constructed or moderately altered; and simple traditional buildings which group well with other listed buildings."

In March 2016 there were 47,288 listed buildings in Scotland. Of these, 8% were Category A, and 50% were Category B, with the remaining 42% being Category C.

== See also ==
- List of listed buildings in Argyll and Bute
