= List of listed buildings in Craignish =

This is a list of listed buildings in the parish of Craignish in Argyll and Bute, Scotland.

== List ==
Name	Location	Date Listed	Grid Ref. (Note: Sometimes known as OSGB36, the grid reference (where provided) is based on the British national grid reference system used by the Ordnance Survey. • "Guide to National Grid". Ordnance Survey. • "Get-a-map". Ordnance Survey.)	Geo-coordinates	Notes	LB Number (Note: Historic Environment Scotland assign a unique alphanumeric identifier to each designated site in Scotland, for listed buildings this always begins with "LB", for example "LB12345".)	Image
Ardfern Village, The Galley Of Lorne				56°10′48″N 5°32′17″W	Category C(S)	4993	Upload another image
Ice-House, Near Lunga House				56°12′00″N 5°33′20″W	Category C(S)	4995	Upload Photo
Kilbride Farmhouse Byre Range and Steading				56°13′08″N 5°29′32″W	Category B	5004	Upload Photo
Barbreck Estate, Gothic Folly				56°12′18″N 5°29′40″W	Category B	4997	Upload Photo
Kirkton Chapel (Kilmory)				56°09′15″N 5°34′44″W	Category B	5001	Upload another image
Campbell Of Barbreck Mausoleum, Dunan Aula, ('The Tomb') Barbreck Estate				56°12′21″N 5°29′36″W	Category C(S)	4999	Upload Photo
Former Craignish Manse, Ardfern Village				56°10′48″N 5°32′27″W	Category B	4992	Upload Photo
Barbreck Bridge, Barbreck River				56°11′37″N 5°30′15″W	Category B	4998	Upload Photo
Lunga House (Daill)				56°11′59″N 5°33′20″W	Category B	4994	Upload another image
Craignish Castle, Head Of Loch Beag				56°09′19″N 5°35′23″W	Category B	5002	Upload another image
Barbreck House				56°12′02″N 5°29′54″W	Category A	4996	Upload another image
Turnalt House				56°12′54″N 5°28′58″W	Category B	5000	Upload Photo
Craignish Castle, The Steading				56°09′22″N 5°35′22″W	Category B	5003	Upload Photo
Craignish Parish Church, Ardfern Village				56°10′46″N 5°32′22″W	Category B	4991	Upload another image

== Key ==
The scheme for classifying buildings in Scotland is:

- Category A: "buildings of national or international importance, either architectural or historic; or fine, little-altered examples of some particular period, style or building type."
- Category B: "buildings of regional or more than local importance; or major examples of some particular period, style or building type, which may have been altered."
- Category C: "buildings of local importance; lesser examples of any period, style, or building type, as originally constructed or moderately altered; and simple traditional buildings which group well with other listed buildings."

In March 2016 there were 47,288 listed buildings in Scotland. Of these, 8% were Category A, and 50% were Category B, with the remaining 42% being Category C.

== See also ==
- List of listed buildings in Argyll and Bute
