= List of listed buildings in Kilmore And Kilbride, Argyll and Bute =

This is a list of listed buildings in the parish of Kilmore And Kilbride in Argyll and Bute, Scotland.

== List ==
Name	Location	Date listed	Geo-coordinates	Notes	Category	LB number	Image
Dunstaffnage Castle			56°27′18″N 5°26′16″W		A	11987	Upload another image
Kilmore Bridge River Nell			56°22′31″N 5°25′53″W		C(S)	11979	Upload Photo
Macdougall Burial Enclosure, Kilbride Burial Ground			56°22′30″N 5°28′19″W		B	11981	Upload Photo
Soroba Road, Soroba House Hotel			56°23′56″N 5°28′16″W		C(S)	11983	Upload Photo
Dunollie Castle			56°25′36″N 5°29′05″W		A	11990	Upload another image
Ganavan, Dunollie House, Stables And Gardener's House			56°25′38″N 5°28′59″W		B	11991	Upload another image
Lerags House			56°21′49″N 5°29′39″W		B	13040	Upload Photo
Campbell Of Lerags Cross-Kilbride			56°22′36″N 5°28′16″W		B	11982	Upload Photo
Connel Bridge Loch Etive			56°27′22″N 5°23′29″W		B	11986	Upload another image See more images
Gallanach			56°22′35″N 5°31′12″W		B	11992	Upload Photo
Gylen Castle			56°22′47″N 5°33′22″W		A	11993	Upload another image
Glenfeochan House			56°21′52″N 5°25′39″W		B	11977	Upload Photo
Kilmore House			56°22′19″N 5°26′06″W		B	11978	Upload Photo
Glencruitten House			56°24′43″N 5°26′18″W		B	11984	Upload Photo
St. Oran's Church Of Scotland, Connel			56°27′15″N 5°23′11″W		B	11985	Upload Photo
Luachrach Cottage Including Garage			56°25′00″N 5°26′21″W		B	49845	Upload Photo
Old Kilmore Kirk			56°22′11″N 5°25′23″W		B	11976	Upload Photo
Kerrera Ferry-House			56°24′01″N 5°31′12″W		C(S)	11994	Upload Photo
Dunach House			56°21′58″N 5°27′41″W		B	13339	Upload Photo
Old Kilbride Kirk			56°22′30″N 5°28′20″W		C(S)	11980	Upload another image
Dunstaffnage Chapel			56°27′15″N 5°26′26″W		A	11988	Upload another image
Dunstaffnage Mains			56°26′52″N 5°26′47″W		B	11989	Upload Photo
Ganavan, Ganavan House, Including Gatepiers And Gate			56°26′09″N 5°28′36″W		B	49220	Upload another image
Carragh Hutcheson, Os cionn Port Àird an t-Snàimh, Cearara / Hutcheson's Monument, Ardantrive, Kerrera					C	52582	Upload Photo

== Key ==
The scheme for classifying buildings in Scotland is:

- Category A: "buildings of national or international importance, either architectural or historic; or fine, little-altered examples of some particular period, style or building type."
- Category B: "buildings of regional or more than local importance; or major examples of some particular period, style or building type, which may have been altered."
- Category C: "buildings of local importance; lesser examples of any period, style, or building type, as originally constructed or moderately altered; and simple traditional buildings which group well with other listed buildings."

In March 2016 there were 47,288 listed buildings in Scotland. Of these, 8% were Category A, and 50% were Category B, with the remaining 42% being Category C.

== See also ==
- List of listed buildings in Argyll and Bute
