= List of listed buildings in Killean And Kilchenzie, Argyll and Bute =

This is a list of listed buildings in the parish of Killean And Kilchenzie in Argyll and Bute, Scotland.

== List ==
Name	Location	Date Listed	Grid Ref. (Note: Sometimes known as OSGB36, the grid reference (where provided) is based on the British national grid reference system used by the Ordnance Survey. • "Guide to National Grid". Ordnance Survey. • "Get-a-map". Ordnance Survey.)	Geo-coordinates	Notes	LB Number (Note: Historic Environment Scotland assign a unique alphanumeric identifier to each designated site in Scotland, for listed buildings this always begins with "LB", for example "LB12345".)	Image
Killean House, Lodge, Gatepiers, Wing Walls And Railings				55°38′19″N 5°39′50″W	Category B	13074	Upload Photo
Killean House				55°38′14″N 5°39′41″W	Category A	12005	Upload another image
Glencreggan House				55°34′49″N 5°41′31″W	Category B	12008	Upload Photo
Macalister Of Glenbarr Burial Enclosure, Cladh Nam Paitean				55°32′58″N 5°42′20″W	Category C(S)	12011	Upload Photo
Tangy Mill				55°29′15″N 5°42′04″W	Category B	12012	Upload Photo
Killean And Kilchenzie Kirk A'Chleit				55°36′52″N 5°41′01″W	Category A	12035	Upload another image See more images
Killean, Former School				55°38′25″N 5°39′47″W	Category B	43250	Upload Photo
Killean Home Farm				55°38′23″N 5°39′47″W	Category B	12006	Upload Photo
Barr House (Glenbarr Abbey)				55°33′54″N 5°41′49″W	Category B	12009	Upload Photo
Barr Doocot				55°33′53″N 5°42′01″W	Category C(S)	12010	Upload Photo
Muasdale Old Bridge, Clachaig Water				55°36′01″N 5°41′03″W	Category C(S)	12015	Upload Photo
Killean, The "Dolls' Houses"				55°38′27″N 5°39′47″W	Category A	43266	Upload another image
St. Kenneth's Chapel, Kilchenzie Burial Ground				55°27′44″N 5°40′53″W	Category C(S)	13798	Upload Photo
Killean Farmhouse				55°38′20″N 5°39′48″W	Category B	13073	Upload Photo
Ballure House				55°41′07″N 5°38′09″W	Category C(S)	12013	Upload Photo
Gortinanane House				55°39′58″N 5°38′57″W	Category C(S)	12014	Upload Photo
Killean Chapel (St John's) Killean Burial Ground				55°38′24″N 5°39′50″W	Category A	12004	Upload Photo
Tigh-Na-Cladaich (Formerly Killean And Kilchenzie Manse) Muasdale				55°35′44″N 5°41′20″W	Category B	12007	Upload Photo
Drummore				55°31′53″N 5°42′04″W	Category C(S)	12016	Upload Photo

== Key ==
The scheme for classifying buildings in Scotland is:

- Category A: "buildings of national or international importance, either architectural or historic; or fine, little-altered examples of some particular period, style or building type."
- Category B: "buildings of regional or more than local importance; or major examples of some particular period, style or building type, which may have been altered."
- Category C: "buildings of local importance; lesser examples of any period, style, or building type, as originally constructed or moderately altered; and simple traditional buildings which group well with other listed buildings."

In March 2016 there were 47,288 listed buildings in Scotland. Of these, 8% were Category A, and 50% were Category B, with the remaining 42% being Category C.

== See also ==
- List of listed buildings in Argyll and Bute
