= List of listed buildings in Coll =

This is a list of listed buildings in the parish of Coll in Argyll and Bute, Scotland.

== List ==
Name	Location	Date Listed	Grid Ref. (Note: Sometimes known as OSGB36, the grid reference (where provided) is based on the British national grid reference system used by the Ordnance Survey. • "Guide to National Grid". Ordnance Survey. • "Get-a-map". Ordnance Survey.)	Geo-coordinates	Notes	LB Number (Note: Historic Environment Scotland assign a unique alphanumeric identifier to each designated site in Scotland, for listed buildings this always begins with "LB", for example "LB12345".)	Image
Grishipoll House, Also Known As The Old White House				56°38′41″N 6°35′06″W	Category C(S)	51048	Upload Photo
Former Breachacha Estate Walled Garden Including Former Greenhouse				56°35′40″N 6°37′03″W	Category C(S)	51093	Upload another image
Breachacha Castle				56°35′30″N 6°37′47″W	Category A	4709	Upload another image
Old Breachacha Castle Including Battery Wall And Outbuildings (Also Known As Breacachadh Castle)				56°35′27″N 6°37′41″W	Category A	4708	Upload another image
Sorisdale Cottage				56°40′53″N 6°27′30″W	Category C(S)	51094	Upload Photo
Breachacha Steading And Farmhouse				56°35′23″N 6°37′49″W	Category B	51092	Upload another image
Maclean Of Coll Burial Place				56°34′34″N 6°38′39″W	Category B	4710	Upload Photo
Coll Parish Church (Church Of Scotland)				56°37′33″N 6°31′40″W	Category C(S)	51091	Upload another image

== Key ==
The scheme for classifying buildings in Scotland is:

- Category A: "buildings of national or international importance, either architectural or historic; or fine, little-altered examples of some particular period, style or building type."
- Category B: "buildings of regional or more than local importance; or major examples of some particular period, style or building type, which may have been altered."
- Category C: "buildings of local importance; lesser examples of any period, style, or building type, as originally constructed or moderately altered; and simple traditional buildings which group well with other listed buildings."

In March 2016 there were 47,288 listed buildings in Scotland. Of these, 8% were Category A, and 50% were Category B, with the remaining 42% being Category C.

== See also ==
- List of listed buildings in Argyll and Bute
