= List of listed buildings in Kildalton And Oa, Argyll and Bute =

This is a list of listed buildings in the parish of Kildalton And Oa in Argyll and Bute, Scotland.

== List ==
Name	Location	Date Listed	Grid Ref. (Note: Sometimes known as OSGB36, the grid reference (where provided) is based on the British national grid reference system used by the Ordnance Survey. • "Guide to National Grid". Ordnance Survey. • "Get-a-map". Ordnance Survey.)	Geo-coordinates	Notes	LB Number (Note: Historic Environment Scotland assign a unique alphanumeric identifier to each designated site in Scotland, for listed buildings this always begins with "LB", for example "LB12345".)	Image
31-35 School Street				55°37′46″N 6°11′21″W	Category C(S)	11970	Upload Photo
Port Ellen Distillery				55°38′00″N 6°11′47″W	Category B	11971	Upload another image
St. Nechtan's Chapel Kilnaughton Burial Ground				55°37′40″N 6°13′14″W	Category B	11974	Upload another image
Port Ellen Village Houses, Near Old Battery 144 (Texa House) And 145 Frederick Crescent				55°37′34″N 6°11′14″W	Category C(S)	12002	Upload Photo
Kildalton Small Cross Outside Kildalton Burial Ground				55°41′04″N 6°02′42″W	Category B	11999	Upload another image
Ardtalla Farmhouse And Steading				55°43′05″N 6°02′09″W	Category C(S)	12000	Upload Photo
Loch Laphroaig, Laphroaig Distillery				55°37′46″N 6°09′07″W	Category C(S)	12435	Upload another image
Ardview Hotel, Frederick Crescent				55°37′48″N 6°11′09″W	Category C(S)	11969	Upload another image
Port Ellen Lighthouse, Carraig Fhada				55°37′13″N 6°12′42″W	Category B	11973	Upload another image
Kidalton Castle				55°39′12″N 6°04′34″W	Category C(S)	12001	Upload Photo
Islay, Port Ellen, Frederick Street, St John's Parish Church Including Boundary Walls				55°37′40″N 6°10′59″W	Category B	49190	Upload another image
The Oa Church, Risabus				55°36′43″N 6°16′00″W	Category C(S)	11972	Upload another image See more images
'The Grange' (Former Old U.F. Manse)				55°37′51″N 6°10′53″W	Category C(S)	12003	Upload Photo
Kildalton Chapel Kidalton Burial Ground				55°41′03″N 6°02′44″W	Category B	13797	Upload another image
Texa Chapel				55°37′04″N 6°08′43″W	Category B	11975	Upload another image

== Key ==
The scheme for classifying buildings in Scotland is:

- Category A: "buildings of national or international importance, either architectural or historic; or fine, little-altered examples of some particular period, style or building type."
- Category B: "buildings of regional or more than local importance; or major examples of some particular period, style or building type, which may have been altered."
- Category C: "buildings of local importance; lesser examples of any period, style, or building type, as originally constructed or moderately altered; and simple traditional buildings which group well with other listed buildings."

In March 2016 there were 47,288 listed buildings in Scotland. Of these, 8% were Category A, and 50% were Category B, with the remaining 42% being Category C.

== See also ==
- List of listed buildings in Argyll and Bute
