= List of listed buildings in North Bute, Argyll and Bute =

This is a list of listed buildings in the parish of North Bute in Argyll and Bute, Scotland.

== List ==
Name	Location	Date Listed	Grid Ref. (Note: Sometimes known as OSGB36, the grid reference (where provided) is based on the British national grid reference system used by the Ordnance Survey. • "Guide to National Grid". Ordnance Survey. • "Get-a-map". Ordnance Survey.)	Geo-coordinates	Notes	LB Number (Note: Historic Environment Scotland assign a unique alphanumeric identifier to each designated site in Scotland, for listed buildings this always begins with "LB", for example "LB12345".)	Image
Port Bannatyne, Pointhouse Lane, Off High Road, Former Coach-House				55°51′31″N 5°04′08″W	Category C(S)	45062	Upload Photo
Port Bannatyne, 4,5,6,7,8,14,15,16,17,18 And 19 Victoria Place, Including Boundary Walls				55°51′38″N 5°04′41″W	Category C(S)	45069	Upload Photo
Kilwhinleck Farm Including Outbuildings And Boundary Wall				55°48′56″N 5°05′59″W	Category C(S)	45038	Upload Photo
Little Kilmory Farm Including Outbuildings, Boundary Wall, Gatepiers And Gates				55°47′31″N 5°07′13″W	Category B	45039	Upload Photo
Milton Farm Including Outbuildings				55°49′16″N 5°05′56″W	Category C(S)	45043	Upload Photo
Port Bannatyne. 42 High Road, Fircliff Including Boundary Walls				55°51′34″N 5°04′12″W	Category B	45047	Upload Photo
Port Bannatyne, High Road, Bus Garage Office				55°51′30″N 5°04′08″W	Category C(S)	45049	Upload Photo
Port Bannatyne, 64 And 65 Marine Road Including Outbuilding				55°51′36″N 5°05′03″W	Category C(S)	45056	Upload Photo
Port Bannatyne, 28, 29 And 30 Shore Road, Ardgowan House Including Boundary Wall And Gatepiers				55°51′39″N 5°04′30″W	Category C(S)	45066	Upload Photo
Etterick Smithy Including Former Blacksmith's Shop, Cottage And Boundary Wall				55°51′15″N 5°07′54″W	Category B	45032	Upload Photo
Kames Castle, Gardener's Cottage				55°51′40″N 5°05′53″W	Category C(S)	45034	Upload Photo
Kames Castle, Gatelodge Including Boundary Walls, Gatepiers And Gates				55°51′41″N 5°05′28″W	Category B	45035	Upload Photo
Kames Castle, Walled Garden Including Outbuilding, Greenhouse And Cottage				55°51′42″N 5°05′59″W	Category B	45036	Upload Photo
Kilmichael Farm Including Boundary Wall				55°53′20″N 5°12′34″W	Category C(S)	45037	Upload Photo
Little Kilmory, Former Granary/Water Mill				55°47′31″N 5°07′11″W	Category B	45040	Upload Photo
Loch Fad, Woodend House, Coach-House				55°48′47″N 5°04′23″W	Category C(S)	45041	Upload Photo
Loch Fad, Woodend House, Cottages				55°48′41″N 5°04′27″W	Category C(S)	45042	Upload Photo
Wester Kames Tower Including Boundary Fence				55°52′00″N 5°05′57″W	Category A	18287	Upload Photo
Stewart Hall Including Conservatory, Well, Boundary Wall And Gatepiers				55°49′08″N 5°06′21″W	Category A	18289	Upload Photo
Port Bannatyne, 67 Marine Road				55°51′37″N 5°05′05″W	Category C(S)	45058	Upload Photo
Port Bannatyne, 42 Shore Road Including Boundary Wall				55°51′39″N 5°04′38″W	Category C(S)	45067	Upload Photo
Port Bannatyne, 22 And 24 High Road, Former Point House, Including Boundary Wall And Railings				55°51′31″N 5°04′07″W	Category B	45046	Upload Photo
Kames Castle And Lodges				55°51′45″N 5°05′45″W	Category B	18286	Upload Photo
Port Bannatyne, 40 Marine Road				55°51′35″N 5°04′55″W	Category C(S)	45052	Upload Photo
Port Bannatyne, 68 And 69 Marine Road				55°51′37″N 5°05′05″W	Category C(S)	45059	Upload Photo
Edinbeg Farm Including Outbuildings And Boundary Wall				55°51′57″N 5°06′09″W	Category C(S)	45031	Upload Photo
Port Bannatyne, 41 And 43 Castle Street, Saltire Place				55°51′34″N 5°04′58″W	Category C(S)	45045	Upload Photo
Port Bannatyne, 37 Marine Road, Port Royal Hotel				55°51′35″N 5°04′54″W	Category C(S)	45050	Upload Photo
Port Bannatyne, Marine Road, Quay				55°51′37″N 5°04′54″W	Category C(S)	45060	Upload Photo
Port Bannatyne, Shore Road, St Colmac, St Bruoc And St Ninian's Church (North Bute Parish Church) Including Hall, Boundary Wall And Gatepiers				55°51′37″N 5°04′17″W	Category B	45068	Upload Photo
Port Bannatyne, 41,42 And 43 Marine Road				55°51′35″N 5°04′56″W	Category C(S)	45053	Upload Photo
Port Bannatyne,9,10,11,12 And 13 Victoria Place, Marine Road, Including Boundary Walls				55°51′38″N 5°04′43″W	Category C(S)	45070	Upload Photo
Glenmore Farm Including Outbuildings And Garden Wall				55°52′49″N 5°09′33″W	Category C(S)	45033	Upload Photo
Port Bannatyne, 59 And 60 Marine Road				55°51′36″N 5°05′01″W	Category C(S)	45054	Upload Photo
Port Bannatyne, 2,3, And 4 Shore Road, Including Boundary Walls And Gatepiers				55°51′36″N 5°04′15″W	Category C(S)	45063	Upload Photo
Port Bannatyne, 26 And 27 Shore Road, Appin Including Boundary Wall, Gatepiers And Gates				55°51′39″N 5°04′29″W	Category C(S)	45065	Upload Photo
Port Bannatyne, Bannatyne Mains Road, Ardentigh Including Boundary Wall And Gatepiers				55°51′35″N 5°04′44″W	Category C(S)	45044	Upload Photo
Loch Fad, Woodend House, Including Outbuilding				55°48′35″N 5°04′24″W	Category B	18290	Upload Photo
Port Bannatyne, 61,62 And 63 Marine Road				55°51′36″N 5°05′02″W	Category C(S)	45055	Upload Photo
Port Bannatyne, 66 Marine Road Including Outbuilding And Boundary Wall				55°51′36″N 5°05′04″W	Category C(S)	45057	Upload Photo
Port Bannatyne, 6 Shore Road Including Boundary Wall				55°51′39″N 5°04′20″W	Category C(S)	45064	Upload Photo
Port Bannatyne, 44 And 46 High Road, Ettrick Bank Including Boundary Walls And Piers				55°51′35″N 5°04′13″W	Category C(S)	45048	Upload Photo
Port Bannatyne, 39 Marine Road				55°51′41″N 5°04′55″W	Category C(S)	45051	Upload Photo
St Colmac's Church Including Graveyard, Boundary Wall, Gatepiers And Gates				55°51′35″N 5°06′44″W	Category C(S)	18283	Upload another image
Loch Fad, Woodend House, Gatelodge And Entrance Gateway				55°48′48″N 5°04′22″W	Category B	18291	Upload Photo

== Key ==
The scheme for classifying buildings in Scotland is:

- Category A: "buildings of national or international importance, either architectural or historic; or fine, little-altered examples of some particular period, style or building type."
- Category B: "buildings of regional or more than local importance; or major examples of some particular period, style or building type, which may have been altered."
- Category C: "buildings of local importance; lesser examples of any period, style, or building type, as originally constructed or moderately altered; and simple traditional buildings which group well with other listed buildings."

In March 2016 there were 47,288 listed buildings in Scotland. Of these, 8% were Category A, and 50% were Category B, with the remaining 42% being Category C.

== See also ==
- List of listed buildings in Argyll and Bute
