= List of listed buildings in Lochgilphead =

This is a list of listed buildings in the parish of Lochgilphead in Argyll and Bute, Scotland.

== List ==
Name	Location	Date listed	Grid ref. (Note: Sometimes known as OSGB36, the grid reference (where provided) is based on the British national grid reference system used by the Ordnance Survey. • "Guide to National Grid". Ordnance Survey. • "Get-a-map". Ordnance Survey.)	Geo-coordinates	Notes	LB number (Note: Historic Environment Scotland assign a unique alphanumeric identifier to each designated site in Scotland, for listed buildings this always begins with "LB", for example "LB12345".)	Image
Lochgilphead Church Head Of Argyle Street				56°02′22″N 5°25′57″W	Category B	37516	Upload another image See more images
81, 83 & 85 Argyll Street				56°02′20″N 5°25′58″W	Category B	37526	Upload Photo
Kilmory Quay				56°02′01″N 5°25′53″W	Category C(S)	37530	Upload Photo
75 & 77 Argyll Street				56°02′20″N 5°25′58″W	Category B	37525	Upload Photo
The White Gates Cossack Street				56°02′03″N 5°25′43″W	Category C(S)	37531	Upload Photo
House, Shop (Burgh Electrics) Poltalloch Street				56°02′12″N 5°26′02″W	Category C(S)	37519	Upload another image
Houses And Shops, Colchester Square, West Side				56°02′13″N 5°26′01″W	Category B	37520	Upload Photo
71 & 73 Argyll Street				56°02′20″N 5°25′59″W	Category B	37524	Upload Photo
1, 3, 5, 7, Paterson Street				56°02′02″N 5°25′49″W	Category C(S)	37527	Upload Photo
"Springbank", Manse Brae				56°02′22″N 5°25′44″W	Category C(S)	37528	Upload Photo
Lochnell Street, The Comm Public House				56°02′12″N 5°25′57″W	Category C(S)	47130	Upload another image
2-4 Argyll Street				56°02′13″N 5°25′59″W	Category B	37522	Upload Photo
The Institute And Post Office Colchester Square, East Side And Lochnell Street				56°02′12″N 5°25′59″W	Category B	37523	Upload Photo
Stag Hotel				56°02′17″N 5°26′00″W	Category C(S)	37532	Upload another image See more images
Christ Church (Episcopal) Bishopton Road				56°02′25″N 5°26′14″W	Category B	37517	Upload Photo
"Islay Lodge" Poltalloch Street				56°02′13″N 5°26′10″W	Category B	37518	Upload Photo
1-3 Argyll Street				56°02′13″N 5°26′00″W	Category C(S)	37521	Upload Photo
"The Old Manse" Manse Brae				56°02′23″N 5°25′38″W	Category B	37529	Upload Photo

== Key ==
The scheme for classifying buildings in Scotland is:

- Category A: "buildings of national or international importance, either architectural or historic; or fine, little-altered examples of some particular period, style or building type."
- Category B: "buildings of regional or more than local importance; or major examples of some particular period, style or building type, which may have been altered."
- Category C: "buildings of local importance; lesser examples of any period, style, or building type, as originally constructed or moderately altered; and simple traditional buildings which group well with other listed buildings."

In March 2016 there were 47,288 listed buildings in Scotland. Of these, 8% were Category A, and 50% were Category B, with the remaining 42% being Category C.

== See also ==
- List of listed buildings in Argyll and Bute
