= List of listed buildings in Torosay =

This is a list of listed buildings in the parish of Torosay in Argyll and Bute, Scotland.

== List ==
Name	Location	Date Listed	Grid Ref. (Note: Sometimes known as OSGB36, the grid reference (where provided) is based on the British national grid reference system used by the Ordnance Survey. • "Guide to National Grid". Ordnance Survey. • "Get-a-map". Ordnance Survey.)	Geo-coordinates	Notes	LB Number (Note: Historic Environment Scotland assign a unique alphanumeric identifier to each designated site in Scotland, for listed buildings this always begins with "LB", for example "LB12345".)	Image
Gruline House				56°28′57″N 5°58′40″W	Category C(S)	17941	Upload Photo
Macquarrie Mausoleum Gruline Policies				56°29′12″N 5°58′56″W	Category A	17942	Upload another image
Pennygown Chapel, Pennygown Burial Ground				56°31′12″N 5°53′48″W	Category B	17946	Upload another image
Old Kinloch Bridge Coladoir River				56°23′25″N 5°58′43″W	Category B	17947	Upload another image
Craignure Jetty				56°28′10″N 5°42′03″W	Category B	17972	Upload another image
Torosay Castle Statues In Statue Walk				56°27′16″N 5°41′15″W	Category A	17929	Upload another image
Lochdonhead Bridge Over Leth Flown				56°25′58″N 5°41′14″W	Category B	17930	Upload another image See more images
Grass Point Jetty				56°25′02″N 5°39′13″W	Category C(S)	17931	Upload Photo
Kinlochspelvie Church Of Scotland				56°21′55″N 5°48′09″W	Category C(S)	17933	Upload another image See more images
Lochbuie House				56°21′21″N 5°51′38″W	Category B	17936	Upload another image
Knock Bridge Over River Ba				56°28′42″N 5°59′12″W	Category B	17939	Upload Photo
Callachally Farm-House				56°30′37″N 5°54′57″W	Category C(S)	17944	Upload Photo
Duart Castle				56°27′22″N 5°39′18″W	Category A	17974	Upload another image
Stable Block, Torosay Castle				56°27′19″N 5°41′24″W	Category B	19844	Upload Photo
Moy Castle, Lochbuie				56°21′18″N 5°51′33″W	Category A	17935	Upload another image
Old Gruline House				56°28′56″N 5°58′39″W	Category B	17940	Upload Photo
Grass Point Ferry House (Captain Leslie)				56°25′00″N 5°39′15″W	Category C(S)	17932	Upload Photo
Mansefield (Formerly Kinlochspelvie Manse)				56°21′50″N 5°48′07″W	Category C(S)	17934	Upload Photo
Pennygown Farm-House				56°30′57″N 5°54′12″W	Category B	17945	Upload Photo
Torosay Castle				56°27′18″N 5°41′14″W	Category A	17975	Upload another image
Lochbuie Home Farm				56°21′20″N 5°51′34″W	Category C(S)	19845	Upload Photo
St Kenneth's Chapel (Caibeal Mheamhair) Laggan				56°20′43″N 5°50′33″W	Category B	17937	Upload Photo
Torosay Kirk, Craignure				56°28′04″N 5°42′01″W	Category B	17970	Upload another image
Bayview Hotel Formerly Torosay Manse, Craignure				56°28′04″N 5°41′54″W	Category B	17971	Upload Photo
Craignure Inn				56°28′06″N 5°42′07″W	Category B	17973	Upload another image
Knock House				56°28′42″N 5°59′26″W	Category B	17938	Upload Photo
Salen Village, Salen Manse				56°31′00″N 5°56′59″W	Category C(S)	17943	Upload Photo

== Key ==
The scheme for classifying buildings in Scotland is:

- Category A: "buildings of national or international importance, either architectural or historic; or fine, little-altered examples of some particular period, style or building type."
- Category B: "buildings of regional or more than local importance; or major examples of some particular period, style or building type, which may have been altered."
- Category C: "buildings of local importance; lesser examples of any period, style, or building type, as originally constructed or moderately altered; and simple traditional buildings which group well with other listed buildings."

In March 2016 there were 47,288 listed buildings in Scotland. Of these, 8% were Category A, and 50% were Category B, with the remaining 42% being Category C.

== See also ==
- List of listed buildings in Argyll and Bute
