= List of listed buildings in Kilmodan =

This is a list of listed buildings in the parish of Kilmodan in Argyll and Bute, Scotland.

== List ==
Name	Location	Date listed	Geo-coordinates	Notes	Category	LB number	Image
Gate-Way, Glendaruel Park			56°01′52″N 5°12′50″W		B	11803	Upload another image
Glendaruel Bridge, River Ruel			56°00′40″N 5°12′57″W		C(S)	13041	Upload another image See more images
Kilmodan Kirk, Clachan of Glendaruel			56°00′31″N 5°13′03″W		B	11800	Upload another image See more images
Campbell Of Glendaruel Burial- Place			56°02′21″N 5°12′23″W		C(S)	11804	Upload another image
Dunans Castle			56°04′21″N 5°08′58″W		B	11805	Upload another image See more images
St. Sophia's R.C. Chapel Glendaruel			56°01′51″N 5°13′01″W		B	11802	Upload another image
Dunans Bridge Alte A'Chaol Ghlinn			56°04′26″N 5°09′00″W		A	11806	Upload another image See more images
Ballochandrain Bridge, River Ruel			55°59′58″N 5°12′57″W		B	11808	Upload Photo
Ormidale Lodge			55°57′12″N 5°11′59″W		C(S)	13785	Upload another image See more images
Fletcher Of Dunans Mausoleum			56°04′18″N 5°09′09″W		C(S)	11807	Upload Photo
Sun-Dial At Ormidale House			55°59′12″N 5°12′08″W		A	11810	Upload another image
Ballochandrain Farm			55°59′57″N 5°13′20″W		C(S)	11809	Upload another image See more images

== Key ==
The scheme for classifying buildings in Scotland is:

- Category A: "buildings of national or international importance, either architectural or historic; or fine, little-altered examples of some particular period, style or building type."
- Category B: "buildings of regional or more than local importance; or major examples of some particular period, style or building type, which may have been altered."
- Category C: "buildings of local importance; lesser examples of any period, style, or building type, as originally constructed or moderately altered; and simple traditional buildings which group well with other listed buildings."

In March 2016 there were 47,288 listed buildings in Scotland. Of these, 8% were Category A, and 50% were Category B, with the remaining 42% being Category C.

== See also ==
- List of listed buildings in Argyll and Bute
