= List of listed buildings in Strachur =

This is a list of listed buildings in the parish of Strachur in Argyll and Bute, Scotland.

== List ==
Name	Location	Date listed	Geo-coordinates	Notes	Category	LB number	Image
Strachur Home Farm			56°10′06″N 5°04′36″W		B	18181	Upload Photo
Invernoaden, Lauder Memorial			56°08′03″N 5°01′29″W		C(S)	50467	Upload another image See more images
Strachur Inn (Now Police Station)			56°10′05″N 5°04′08″W		B	18179	Upload Photo
Bridge, (At Home Farm) Strachur Park			56°10′07″N 5°04′36″W		B	19857	Upload Photo
Strachur Kirk			56°10′06″N 5°04′07″W		B	18178	Upload another image
Glenshellish House And Farm			56°07′52″N 5°02′17″W		B	19858	Upload another image
Glenbranter Farmhouse Including Bothy, Railings And Gates			56°07′48″N 5°02′37″W		C(S)	50466	Upload another image
Bridge Strachur Park			56°10′14″N 5°04′22″W		B	18182	Upload another image
Strachurmore Farmhouse			56°09′45″N 5°03′12″W		B	18184	Upload Photo
The Smiddy			56°10′01″N 5°04′01″W		B	18781	Upload another image See more images
Balliemore, Including Outbuildings And Boundary Walls			56°08′47″N 5°03′22″W		C(S)	18185	Upload Photo
Glenbranter, Bridgend, Bridge Over The River Cur			56°08′15″N 5°02′15″W		B	18186	Upload Photo
Gate-Way And Gate-Lodge Strachur Park			56°10′16″N 5°04′53″W		B	18183	Upload another image
Balliemore Cottage			56°08′54″N 5°03′28″W		C(S)	50465	Upload Photo
Strachur House			56°10′09″N 5°04′35″W		B	18180	Upload another image See more images
St Catherines, St Catherines Hotel (Old Ferry Inn)			56°13′22″N 5°01′53″W		C(S)	49362	Upload another image See more images
Loch Eck, Coire Ealt			56°07′07″N 4°59′59″W		C(S)	50468	Upload Photo

== Key ==
The scheme for classifying buildings in Scotland is:

- Category A: "buildings of national or international importance, either architectural or historic; or fine, little-altered examples of some particular period, style or building type."
- Category B: "buildings of regional or more than local importance; or major examples of some particular period, style or building type, which may have been altered."
- Category C: "buildings of local importance; lesser examples of any period, style, or building type, as originally constructed or moderately altered; and simple traditional buildings which group well with other listed buildings."

In March 2016 there were 47,288 listed buildings in Scotland. Of these, 8% were Category A, and 50% were Category B, with the remaining 42% being Category C.

== See also ==
- List of listed buildings in Argyll and Bute

== Bibliography ==
- All entries, addresses and coordinates are based on data from Historic Scotland. This data falls under the Open Government Licence
