= List of listed buildings in Tiree, Argyll and Bute =

This is a list of listed buildings in the parish of Tiree in Argyll and Bute, Scotland.

== List ==
Name	Location	Date Listed	Grid Ref. (Note: Sometimes known as OSGB36, the grid reference (where provided) is based on the British national grid reference system used by the Ordnance Survey. • "Guide to National Grid". Ordnance Survey. • "Get-a-map". Ordnance Survey.)	Geo-coordinates	Notes	LB Number (Note: Historic Environment Scotland assign a unique alphanumeric identifier to each designated site in Scotland, for listed buildings this always begins with "LB", for example "LB12345".)	Image
Hynish, Harbour And Lighthouse Establishment, Including Signal Tower, Housing, Sheds/Stores, Dam And Walled Enclosures				56°26′52″N 6°53′40″W	Category A	17848	Upload another image
Balevullin Cottage Owned By Frances Walker				56°31′00″N 6°57′11″W	Category B	17852	Upload Photo
Kilkenneth				56°29′39″N 6°57′58″W	Category B	17862	Upload Photo
The Green				56°31′40″N 6°56′03″W	Category B	17864	Upload Photo
Mannal				56°27′40″N 6°53′35″W	Category B	17866	Upload Photo
Heanish, Brandon Cottage				56°29′31″N 6°48′53″W	Category B	19836	Upload Photo
Sandaig, The Terrace (South End Dwelling)				56°28′53″N 6°58′18″W	Category C(S)	18476	Upload Photo
St Columba's Chapel, Near Kirkapol Burial Ground				56°31′29″N 6°48′42″W	Category B	17842	Upload Photo
St. Kenneth's Chapel (Cill Choinnich) Kilkenneth Burial Ground				56°29′44″N 6°58′07″W	Category B	17847	Upload Photo
4 Balevullin				56°30′51″N 6°56′42″W	Category B	18477	Upload Photo
Dun Beag Cottage, (L Maclean) Scarinish				56°30′07″N 6°48′30″W	Category B	17845	Upload Photo
Barrapol Clachan Dubh				56°28′46″N 6°57′27″W	Category B	17853	Upload Photo
Ruaig 5A, B, C, D, E Brock				56°31′39″N 6°46′20″W	Category B	17867	Upload Photo
Hynish, Hynish Farm Steading				56°26′48″N 6°53′49″W	Category C(S)	49356	Upload Photo
Sandaig, The Terrace (North End And Centre Dwellings)				56°28′53″N 6°58′19″W	Category B	18475	Upload Photo
3 Kilmoluaig				56°30′20″N 6°55′45″W	Category A	17857	Upload Photo
3 Moss				56°29′14″N 6°56′29″W	Category B	17860	Upload Photo
Balmartine Tigh Fiona Ghall				56°28′08″N 6°53′47″W	Category B	17863	Upload Photo
The Green				56°31′42″N 6°56′04″W	Category B	17865	Upload Photo
Cornaig, Congregational Church				56°31′16″N 6°54′23″W	Category C(S)	50169	Upload another image
Island House, Loch An Eilean, Heylipol				56°29′13″N 6°53′53″W	Category B	19834	Upload another image
Barrapol (Hector Mcneill)				56°28′15″N 6°57′12″W	Category B	17854	Upload Photo
13 Kilmoluaig				56°30′32″N 6°55′31″W	Category A	17859	Upload Photo
Barrapol (Morvan House) Or 'Drover's				56°28′48″N 6°57′00″W	Category B	17861	Upload Photo
Tiree Parish Church Kirkapol				56°31′12″N 6°48′48″W	Category B	17594	Upload another image See more images
Kirkapol Chapel (St Peter's) Cladh Beag, Kirkapol Burial Ground				56°31′27″N 6°48′41″W	Category B	17595	Upload Photo
Skerryvore Lighthouse				56°19′23″N 7°06′58″W	Category A	17849	Upload another image See more images
Cottages, (John Henderson's) Moss				56°29′37″N 6°56′29″W	Category B	17846	Upload Photo
7 Balevullin (Cameron)				56°30′36″N 6°56′49″W	Category B	17850	Upload Photo
Kenovay, (Crawford)				56°30′42″N 6°53′09″W	Category B	17856	Upload Photo
Balmartine				56°28′05″N 6°53′50″W	Category B	19835	Upload Photo
Scarinish				56°29′59″N 6°48′37″W	Category B	19837	Upload Photo
Tishabet, Formerly (Tiree Manse) Gott				56°30′37″N 6°48′28″W	Category B	17843	Upload Photo
Pierview Cottage (J Maclean's) Scarinish				56°30′09″N 6°48′31″W	Category B	17844	Upload Photo
Balevullin Creag Chrom				56°31′10″N 6°57′26″W	Category B	17851	Upload Photo

== Key ==
The scheme for classifying buildings in Scotland is:

- Category A: "buildings of national or international importance, either architectural or historic; or fine, little-altered examples of some particular period, style or building type."
- Category B: "buildings of regional or more than local importance; or major examples of some particular period, style or building type, which may have been altered."
- Category C: "buildings of local importance; lesser examples of any period, style, or building type, as originally constructed or moderately altered; and simple traditional buildings which group well with other listed buildings."

In March 2016 there were 47,288 listed buildings in Scotland. Of these, 8% were Category A, and 50% were Category B, with the remaining 42% being Category C.

== See also ==
- List of listed buildings in Argyll and Bute
