= List of listed buildings in Argyll and Bute =

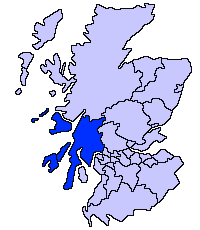
Argyll and Bute shown within Scotland

This is a list of listed buildings in Argyll and Bute. The list is split out by parish.

- List of listed buildings in Ardchattan And Muckairn, Argyll and Bute
- List of listed buildings in Arrochar, Argyll and Bute
- List of listed buildings in Bonhill, Argyll and Bute
- List of listed buildings in Campbeltown, Argyll and Bute
- List of listed buildings in Cardross, Argyll and Bute
- List of listed buildings in Coll, Argyll and Bute
- List of listed buildings in Colonsay And Oronsay, Argyll and Bute
- List of listed buildings in Cove And Kilcreggan, Argyll and Bute
- List of listed buildings in Craignish, Argyll and Bute
- List of listed buildings in Dunoon And Kilmun, Argyll and Bute
- List of listed buildings in Dunoon, Argyll and Bute
- List of listed buildings in Gigha And Cara, Argyll and Bute
- List of listed buildings in Glenorchy And Inishail, Argyll and Bute
- List of listed buildings in Helensburgh, Argyll and Bute
- List of listed buildings in Inveraray, Argyll and Bute
- List of listed buildings in Inverchaolain, Argyll and Bute
- List of listed buildings in Jura, Argyll and Bute
- List of listed buildings in Kilbrandon And Kilchattan, Argyll and Bute
- List of listed buildings in Kilcalmonell, Argyll and Bute
- List of listed buildings in Kilchoman, Argyll and Bute
- List of listed buildings in Kilchrenan And Dalavich, Argyll and Bute
- List of listed buildings in Kildalton And Oa, Argyll and Bute
- List of listed buildings in Kilfinan, Argyll and Bute
- List of listed buildings in Kilfinichen And Kilvickeon, Argyll and Bute
- List of listed buildings in Killarow And Kilmeny, Argyll and Bute
- List of listed buildings in Killean And Kilchenzie, Argyll and Bute
- List of listed buildings in Kilmartin, Argyll and Bute
- List of listed buildings in Kilmichael Glassary, Argyll and Bute
- List of listed buildings in Kilmodan, Argyll and Bute
- List of listed buildings in Kilmore And Kilbride, Argyll and Bute
- List of listed buildings in Kilninian And Kilmore, Argyll and Bute
- List of listed buildings in Kilninver And Kilmelford, Argyll and Bute
- List of listed buildings in Kingarth, Argyll and Bute
- List of listed buildings in Lismore And Appin, Argyll and Bute
- List of listed buildings in Lochgilphead, Argyll and Bute
- List of listed buildings in Lochgoilhead And Kilmorich, Argyll and Bute
- List of listed buildings in Luss, Argyll and Bute
- List of listed buildings in North Bute, Argyll and Bute
- List of listed buildings in North Knapdale, Argyll and Bute
- List of listed buildings in Oban, Argyll and Bute
- List of listed buildings in Rhu, Argyll and Bute
- List of listed buildings in Rosneath, Argyll and Bute
- List of listed buildings in Rothesay, Argyll and Bute
- List of listed buildings in Saddell And Skipness, Argyll and Bute
- List of listed buildings in South Knapdale, Argyll and Bute
- List of listed buildings in Southend, Argyll and Bute
- List of listed buildings in Strachur, Argyll and Bute
- List of listed buildings in Strathlachlan, Argyll and Bute
- List of listed buildings in Tiree, Argyll and Bute
- List of listed buildings in Tobermory, Argyll and Bute
- List of listed buildings in Torosay, Argyll and Bute

== See also ==
- Scheduled monuments in Argyll and Bute
