= List of listed buildings in Rosneath, Argyll and Bute =

This is a list of listed buildings in the parish of Rosneath in Argyll and Bute, Scotland.

== List ==
| Name | Location | Date Listed | Grid Ref. (Note: Sometimes known as OSGB36, the grid reference (where provided) is based on the British national grid reference system used by the Ordnance Survey. • "Guide to National Grid". Ordnance Survey. • "Get-a-map". Ordnance Survey.) | Geo-coordinates | Notes | LB Number (Note: Historic Environment Scotland assign a unique alphanumeric identifier to each designated site in Scotland, for listed buildings this always begins with "LB", for example "LB12345".) | Image |
|---|---|---|---|---|---|---|---|
| Shore Road, Carloch With Boundary Walls And Gatepiers | | | | 56°04′24″N 4°50′21″W | Category C(S) | 42641 | Upload Photo |
| Clynder, Back Road, Glenavon | | | | 56°01′13″N 4°48′55″W | Category C(S) | 42618 | Upload Photo |
| Clynder, Shore Road, Former Coach House To Achnashie | | | | 56°00′50″N 4°48′29″W | Category C(S) | 42619 | Upload Photo |
| Clynder, Shore Road, Bonaln | | | | 56°01′18″N 4°48′54″W | Category B | 42620 | Upload Photo |
| Rosneath Castle Estate, Gallowhill, Well House | | | | 55°59′32″N 4°47′35″W | Category C(S) | 42629 | Upload Photo |
| Rosneath Village, 1-4 (Inclusive) Clachan Bridge | | | | 56°00′37″N 4°48′07″W | Category C(S) | 42632 | Upload Photo |
| Shore Road, Aikenshaw With Service Block | | | | 56°02′49″N 4°50′10″W | Category B | 42637 | Upload Photo |
| Shore Road, Glenard | | | | 56°04′27″N 4°50′25″W | Category C(S) | 42643 | Upload Photo |
| Shore Road, Loch-Na-Brae | | | | 56°03′32″N 4°50′33″W | Category C(S) | 42645 | Upload Photo |
| Barremman Farm With Steading, Coachhouse And Stables | | | | 56°01′43″N 4°49′24″W | Category B | 42617 | Upload Photo |
| Gareloch House With Retaining And Boundary Walls And Gatepiers | | | | 56°00′51″N 4°48′31″W | Category A | 42621 | Upload Photo |
| Portkil, Former Coach Master's House And Coach House | | | | 55°59′18″N 4°48′16″W | Category C(S) | 42624 | Upload Photo |
| Rosneath Village, The Old Manse | | | | 56°00′32″N 4°48′09″W | Category C(S) | 42633 | Upload Photo |
| Rosneath Village, St Modan's Parish Church | | | | 56°00′34″N 4°48′05″W | Category A | 42634 | Upload another image See more images |
| Shore Road, Aldavhu With Boundary Walls And Gatepiers | | | | 56°04′39″N 4°50′21″W | Category C(S) | 42638 | Upload Photo |
| Shore Road, Ardchoille With Gatepiers | | | | 56°01′50″N 4°49′27″W | Category B | 42639 | Upload Photo |
| Rosneath Castle Estate, Bathwell (Near Parkhead) | | | | 55°59′56″N 4°47′07″W | Category A | 42625 | Upload Photo |
| Rosneath Point, Ferry Inn | | | | 56°00′43″N 4°47′46″W | Category A | 42630 | Upload Photo |
| Portkil Cottage | | | | 55°59′17″N 4°48′17″W | Category C(S) | 42623 | Upload Photo |
| Shore Road, Dahlandhui Hotel With Gazebo, Stables, Boundary Wall And Gatepiers | | | | 56°04′22″N 4°50′19″W | Category B | 42642 | Upload Photo |
| Shore Road, Glengair | | | | 56°01′54″N 4°49′30″W | Category B | 42644 | Upload Photo |
| Rosneath Point, Ferry Inn Cottage | | | | 56°00′43″N 4°47′48″W | Category C(S) | 42631 | Upload Photo |
| Rosneath Village, No (Former Police Station) | | | | 56°00′37″N 4°48′06″W | Category B | 42635 | Upload Photo |
| Rosneath Village, St Modan's Old Church With Graveyard And Boundary Walls | | | | 56°00′33″N 4°48′11″W | Category B | 42636 | Upload Photo |
| Barbour Road, Knockderry Farm Steading And Farmhouse | | | | 56°00′31″N 4°50′50″W | Category C(S) | 42616 | Upload Photo |
| Rosneath Castle Estate, Ice House | | | | 56°00′00″N 4°46′59″W | Category C(S) | 42626 | Upload Photo |
| Rosneath Castle Estate, Parkhead With Walled Garden | | | | 55°59′53″N 4°46′55″W | Category C(S) | 42627 | Upload Photo |
| Rosneath Castle Estate, Rosneath Home Farm | | | | 55°59′39″N 4°46′56″W | Category A | 42628 | Upload another image |
| Shore Road, Stroul Lodge | | | | 56°00′59″N 4°48′43″W | Category B | 42647 | Upload Photo |
| Millbrae, Camsail House (Former Free Church Manse) | | | | 55°59′50″N 4°48′15″W | Category C(S) | 42622 | Upload Photo |
| Shore Road, Loch-Na-Gare | | | | 56°02′57″N 4°50′15″W | Category C(S) | 42646 | Upload Photo |

== Key ==
The scheme for classifying buildings in Scotland is:

- Category A: "buildings of national or international importance, either architectural or historic; or fine, little-altered examples of some particular period, style or building type."
- Category B: "buildings of regional or more than local importance; or major examples of some particular period, style or building type, which may have been altered."
- Category C: "buildings of local importance; lesser examples of any period, style, or building type, as originally constructed or moderately altered; and simple traditional buildings which group well with other listed buildings."

In March 2016 there were 47,288 listed buildings in Scotland. Of these, 8% were Category A, and 50% were Category B, with the remaining 42% being Category C.

== See also ==
- List of listed buildings in Argyll and Bute
