= List of listed buildings in Lochgoilhead and Kilmorich, Argyll and Bute =

This is a list of listed buildings in the parish of Lochgoilhead and Kilmorich in Argyll and Bute, Scotland.

== List ==
Name	Location	Date Listed	Grid Ref. (Note: Sometimes known as OSGB36, the grid reference (where provided) is based on the British national grid reference system used by the Ordnance Survey. • "Guide to National Grid". Ordnance Survey. • "Get-a-map". Ordnance Survey.)	Geo-coordinates	Notes	LB Number (Note: Historic Environment Scotland assign a unique alphanumeric identifier to each designated site in Scotland, for listed buildings this always begins with "LB", for example "LB12345".)	Image
Loch Goil, The Lodge, (formerly Woodside Lodge), including Summerhouse and Fountain				56°08′57″N 4°54′13″W	Category B	45637	Upload Photo
River Fyne Bridge				56°16′21″N 4°55′02″W	Category B	11768	Upload another image
Lochgoilhead. Lochgoilhead and Kilmorich Parish Church (The Church of the Three Holy Brethren) Inc. Graveyard, Boundary Walls, Gatepiers and Gates				56°10′18″N 4°54′12″W	Category B	11811	Upload Photo
Carrick Castle Church including Gates and Railings				56°06′51″N 4°54′35″W	Category C(S)	50349	Upload Photo
Carrick Castle, Craigard, including Gatepiers and Boundary Walls				56°06′21″N 4°54′16″W	Category C(S)	50350	Upload Photo
Drumsyniebeg Farm				56°11′47″N 4°55′14″W	Category C(S)	50354	Upload Photo
Lochgoilhead, Greenbank including Boundary Walls				56°10′11″N 4°54′01″W	Category C(S)	50356	Upload Photo
Gate-Lodge Ardkinglas Policies				56°14′49″N 4°56′06″W	Category B	11820	Upload another image
Drimsynie Court, Including Cobbled Courtyard				56°10′23″N 4°54′34″W	Category C(S)	50352	Upload another image
Lochgoilhead, Inverlounin Road, Woodlands, Including Boatshed And Grotto, Pedestrian Gates And Gateposts				56°09′20″N 4°53′34″W	Category B	50355	Upload another image
Pole Farmhouse And Steading				56°11′50″N 4°54′59″W	Category C(S)	50360	Upload another image
Dunderave Castle (Dundaramh)				56°14′35″N 4°59′53″W	Category A	11769	Upload another image See more images
Drimsynie House Hotel				56°10′19″N 4°54′48″W	Category B	11814	Upload another image
Lochgoilhead, Inverlounin Road, Burnknowe Including Boathouse				56°09′38″N 4°53′50″W	Category B	50358	Upload Photo
Butter Bridge, Kinglas Water				56°14′43″N 4°51′05″W	Category B	50538	Upload another image
Carrick Castle				56°06′32″N 4°54′20″W	Category A	11815	Upload another image
Kilmorich Kirk, Cairndow				56°15′15″N 4°56′19″W	Category A	11818	Upload another image
Lochgoilhead, Hall Road, Howebank Including Boundary Walls, Railings And Gates				56°10′21″N 4°54′06″W	Category C(S)	50357	Upload Photo
Lochgoilhead, Inverlounin Road, The Peel House Including Boundary Walls And Gatepiers				56°09′46″N 4°53′53″W	Category C(S)	50359	Upload Photo
Lochgoilhead, Sundial				56°10′16″N 4°54′11″W	Category B	13039	Upload Photo
Glen Croe, 'Rest And Be Thankful' Stone				56°13′31″N 4°51′22″W	Category C(S)	11816	Upload another image
Carrick Castle, Hillside Place				56°06′29″N 4°54′23″W	Category C(S)	50351	Upload another image
Ardkinglas House				56°15′03″N 4°56′50″W	Category A	13786	Upload another image See more images
Cairndow Inn				56°15′22″N 4°56′15″W	Category C(S)	11819	Upload another image
Drimsynie, Bridge Over Eas A' Chruisgein				56°10′07″N 4°54′49″W	Category C(S)	50353	Upload Photo
Lochgoilhead Bridge Over River Goil				56°10′29″N 4°54′12″W	Category B	11813	Upload another image

== Key ==
The scheme for classifying buildings in Scotland is:

- Category A: "buildings of national or international importance, either architectural or historic; or fine, little-altered examples of some particular period, style or building type."
- Category B: "buildings of regional or more than local importance; or major examples of some particular period, style or building type, which may have been altered."
- Category C: "buildings of local importance; lesser examples of any period, style, or building type, as originally constructed or moderately altered; and simple traditional buildings which group well with other listed buildings."

In March 2016 there were 47,288 listed buildings in Scotland. Of these, 8% were Category A, and 50% were Category B, with the remaining 42% being Category C.

== See also ==
- List of listed buildings in Argyll and Bute
