= List of listed buildings in Kilcalmonell, Argyll and Bute =

This is a list of listed buildings in the parish of Kilcalmonell in Argyll and Bute, Scotland.

== List ==
| Name | Location | Date Listed | Grid Ref. (Note: Sometimes known as OSGB36, the grid reference (where provided) is based on the British national grid reference system used by the Ordnance Survey. • "Guide to National Grid". Ordnance Survey. • "Get-a-map". Ordnance Survey.) | Geo-coordinates | Notes | LB Number (Note: Historic Environment Scotland assign a unique alphanumeric identifier to each designated site in Scotland, for listed buildings this always begins with "LB", for example "LB12345".) | Image |
|---|---|---|---|---|---|---|---|
| Ballinakill Steading Ballinakill Estate, Clachan | | | | 55°44′49″N 5°33′06″W | Category B | 12022 | Upload Photo |
| Ronachan House | | | | 55°44′17″N 5°35′45″W | Category B | 12024 | Upload Photo |
| Gatenagrenach Farmhouse | | | | 55°46′54″N 5°30′35″W | Category C(S) | 12027 | Upload Photo |
| Tarbert Church Of Scotland, Campbeltown Road | | | | 55°51′46″N 5°25′02″W | Category B | 12029 | Upload Photo |
| Tarbert Hotel, Harbour Street, Kintyre Place, And Church Street | | | | 55°51′48″N 5°24′52″W | Category C(S) | 12030 | Upload Photo |
| 'Queensgate' Pier Road | | | | 55°51′54″N 5°24′22″W | Category C(S) | 12032 | Upload Photo |
| Ronachan Estate, North Gate Lodge | | | | 55°44′22″N 5°35′23″W | Category C(S) | 13070 | Upload Photo |
| Kirkland (Formerly) Kilcalmonell And Kilberry Manse Clachan | | | | 55°44′48″N 5°33′53″W | Category B | 12018 | Upload Photo |
| Gateway, Kilcalmonell Free Church | | | | 55°44′47″N 5°33′44″W | Category C(S) | 12020 | Upload Photo |
| Ballinakill House Clachan | | | | 55°44′49″N 5°33′14″W | Category C(S) | 12021 | Upload Photo |
| Tarbert Harbour Walls Including Former Weighbridge, Slipways And Beilding | | | | 55°51′48″N 5°24′48″W | Category B | 48935 | Upload Photo |
| Kilcalmonell Free Church, Clachan | | | | 55°44′48″N 5°33′43″W | Category B | 12019 | Upload Photo |
| Spion Kop Kennels, Lonlia, Glenreasdell Estate | | | | 55°47′31″N 5°27′00″W | Category C(S) | 12028 | Upload Photo |
| Tarbert Castle | | | | 55°51′52″N 5°24′33″W | Category B | 12031 | Upload Photo |
| Kilcalmonell And Kilberry Parish Church, Clachan | | | | 55°44′46″N 5°33′50″W | Category B | 12017 | Upload Photo |
| Columba Hotel, Pier Road | | | | 55°51′55″N 5°23′59″W | Category C(S) | 12033 | Upload Photo |
| Pier House, Pier Road | | | | 55°51′56″N 5°23′53″W | Category C(S) | 12034 | Upload Photo |
| Ballinakill Gate-Lodge, Ballinakill Estate, Clachan | | | | 55°44′49″N 5°33′42″W | Category C(S) | 12023 | Upload Photo |
| Bridge I, Allt Ronachain, Ronachan Estate | | | | 55°44′20″N 5°35′28″W | Category C(S) | 12025 | Upload Photo |
| Bridge Ii, Allt Ronachain, Ronachan Estate | | | | 55°44′15″N 5°35′43″W | Category C(S) | 12026 | Upload Photo |

== Key ==
The scheme for classifying buildings in Scotland is:

- Category A: "buildings of national or international importance, either architectural or historic; or fine, little-altered examples of some particular period, style or building type."
- Category B: "buildings of regional or more than local importance; or major examples of some particular period, style or building type, which may have been altered."
- Category C: "buildings of local importance; lesser examples of any period, style, or building type, as originally constructed or moderately altered; and simple traditional buildings which group well with other listed buildings."

In March 2016 there were 47,288 listed buildings in Scotland. Of these, 8% were Category A, and 50% were Category B, with the remaining 42% being Category C.

== See also ==
- List of listed buildings in Argyll and Bute
