= List of listed buildings in Kilmartin, Argyll and Bute =

This is a list of listed buildings in the Scottish parish of Kilmartin in Argyll and Bute, Scotland.

== List ==
Name	Location	Date listed	Grid ref. (Note: Sometimes known as OSGB36, the grid reference (where provided) is based on the British national grid reference system used by the Ordnance Survey. • "Guide to National Grid". Ordnance Survey. • "Get-a-map". Ordnance Survey.)	Geo-coordinates	Notes	LB number (Note: Historic Environment Scotland assign a unique alphanumeric identifier to each designated site in Scotland, for listed buildings this always begins with "LB", for example "LB12345".)	Image
St. Columba's Episcopal Chapel, Poltalloch Estate				56°06′41″N 5°30′51″W	Category B	13764	Upload Photo
Neil Campbell Tomb, Kilmartin Church Kilmartin Village				56°07′59″N 5°29′11″W	Category B	11491	Upload Photo
Kintraw Bridge, Kintraw Burn				56°11′20″N 5°29′53″W	Category C(S)	11456	Upload Photo
Ice-House, Crinan Ferry				56°05′07″N 5°32′34″W	Category B	11452	Upload Photo
Crinan House Crinan Ferry				56°05′06″N 5°32′37″W	Category B	11453	Upload Photo
North Lodge (And Gate-Way), Poltalloch Estate				56°07′17″N 5°30′10″W	Category B	11493	Upload Photo
Duntrune Castle By Loch Crinan				56°06′07″N 5°32′58″W	Category B	11496	Upload Photo
Kilmartin Primary School				56°07′34″N 5°29′40″W	Category B	13338	Upload Photo
Gate-Way, Duntrune Estate				56°06′17″N 5°32′09″W	Category B	11451	Upload Photo
Carnassarie Castle				56°09′04″N 5°28′50″W	Category A	11454	Upload another image
Islandadd Bridge				56°04′29″N 5°31′44″W	Category A	13042	Upload another image
Ford Hotel, Ford Of Loch Awe Village				56°10′36″N 5°26′08″W	Category C(S)	11455	Upload Photo
Poltalloch House (Callton Mor)				56°06′40″N 5°31′03″W	Category B	11494	Upload Photo
Kilmartin Parish Church, Kilmartin Village				56°07′59″N 5°29′11″W	Category B	11490	Upload another image See more images
Kilmartin Castle, Kilmartin Village				56°08′08″N 5°29′05″W	Category B	11492	Upload Photo
Barloisnoch Farm, Poltalloch Estate				56°06′15″N 5°31′17″W	Category B	11495	Upload Photo

== Key ==
The scheme for classifying buildings in Scotland is:

- Category A: "buildings of national or international importance, either architectural or historic; or fine, little-altered examples of some particular period, style or building type."
- Category B: "buildings of regional or more than local importance; or major examples of some particular period, style or building type, which may have been altered."
- Category C: "buildings of local importance; lesser examples of any period, style, or building type, as originally constructed or moderately altered; and simple traditional buildings which group well with other listed buildings."

In March 2016 there were 47,288 listed buildings in Scotland. Of these, 8% were Category A, and 50% were Category B, with the remaining 42% being Category C.

== See also ==
- List of listed buildings in Argyll and Bute
