= List of listed buildings in Glenorchy And Inishail, Argyll and Bute =

This is a list of listed buildings in the parish of Glenorchy And Inishail in Argyll and Bute, Scotland.

== List ==
Name	Location	Date Listed	Grid Ref. (Note: Sometimes known as OSGB36, the grid reference (where provided) is based on the British national grid reference system used by the Ordnance Survey. • "Guide to National Grid". Ordnance Survey. • "Get-a-map". Ordnance Survey.)	Geo-coordinates	Notes	LB Number (Note: Historic Environment Scotland assign a unique alphanumeric identifier to each designated site in Scotland, for listed buildings this always begins with "LB", for example "LB12345".)	Image
Bridge Of Orchy Station				56°30′58″N 4°45′51″W	Category B	13072	Upload another image See more images
Innishail Kirk, Near Innistrynish				56°21′52″N 5°03′43″W	Category B	12175	Upload Photo
Fraoch Eilean Castle Fraoch Eilean, Loch Awe				56°22′52″N 5°03′53″W	Category C(S)	12177	Upload Photo
Old Bridge Of Awe River Awe				56°25′09″N 5°11′40″W	Category B	12178	Upload Photo
Lorne Furnace And Ancillary Buildings, Bonawe				56°26′11″N 5°13′46″W	Category A	12180	Upload another image
Glenorchy Manse Clachan An Diseart				56°24′15″N 4°58′20″W	Category B	13808	Upload Photo
Drochaid Tolaghan, Inveroran				56°31′56″N 4°48′48″W	Category C(S)	12169	Upload Photo
St Findoca's Chapel, Innishail, Loch Awe				56°22′27″N 5°04′54″W	Category B	12176	Upload Photo
Ardanaseig House (New Inverawe) Tirvane				56°22′39″N 5°05′50″W	Category B	12182	Upload Photo
Dalmally Railway Station				56°24′04″N 4°59′00″W	Category C(S)	13352	Upload another image See more images
Glenorchy Kirk Clachan An Diseart				56°24′15″N 4°58′16″W	Category A	12192	Upload another image See more images
Forest Lodge, Black Mount				56°32′27″N 4°48′51″W	Category B	12171	Upload Photo
Lorne Furnace Jetty (Kelly's Quay)				56°26′23″N 5°14′04″W	Category B	12181	Upload Photo
Bonawe House				56°26′11″N 5°13′31″W	Category B	12183	Upload Photo
Ardbrecknish House				56°20′38″N 5°07′33″W	Category B	13071	Upload Photo
Kilchurn Castle On Island In Loch Awe				56°24′14″N 5°01′39″W	Category A	12194	Upload Photo
Duncan Ban Mcintyre Monument Beacon Hill				56°23′18″N 5°00′28″W	Category B	12167	Upload Photo
Bridge Of Orchy River Orchy				56°31′05″N 4°46′14″W	Category B	12168	Upload another image See more images
Victoria Bridge Linne Nam Beatnach				56°32′23″N 4°48′50″W	Category B	12170	Upload Photo
Achallader Castle Near Loch Tulla				56°33′37″N 4°43′54″W	Category B	12173	Upload Photo
New Bridge Of Awe River Awe				56°25′12″N 5°11′39″W	Category B	12179	Upload Photo
Dalmally Bridge River Orchy				56°24′19″N 4°58′25″W	Category B	12193	Upload Photo
Auch Bridge, Allt Chonoghlais				56°29′02″N 4°43′06″W	Category B	12174	Upload Photo
'The Kennels' Near Forest Lodge, Black Mount				56°32′28″N 4°48′52″W	Category B	12172	Upload Photo
Sloy Awe Hydro Electric Scheme, Sron Mor Power Station				56°20′13″N 4°58′33″W	Category C(S)	51690	Upload Photo

== Key ==
The scheme for classifying buildings in Scotland is:

- Category A: "buildings of national or international importance, either architectural or historic; or fine, little-altered examples of some particular period, style or building type."
- Category B: "buildings of regional or more than local importance; or major examples of some particular period, style or building type, which may have been altered."
- Category C: "buildings of local importance; lesser examples of any period, style, or building type, as originally constructed or moderately altered; and simple traditional buildings which group well with other listed buildings."

In March 2016 there were 47,288 listed buildings in Scotland. Of these, 8% were Category A, and 50% were Category B, with the remaining 42% being Category C.

== See also ==
- List of listed buildings in Argyll and Bute
