= List of listed buildings in Killarow And Kilmeny, Argyll and Bute =

This is a list of listed buildings in the parish of Killarow and Kilmeny in Argyll and Bute, Scotland.

== List ==
| Name | Location | Date listed | Geo-coordinates | Notes | Category | LB number | Image |
|---|---|---|---|---|---|---|---|
| Bridgend Hotel And Steading | | | 55°46′51″N 6°14′57″W | | C(S) | 12189 | Upload Photo |
| House (Campbell) Shop, And Post Office By River Sorn | | | 55°46′53″N 6°14′59″W | | C(S) | 12190 | Upload Photo |
| Islay Home Farm | | | 55°47′07″N 6°15′05″W | | B | 12144 | Upload Photo |
| Bluehouse, Islay House Estate | | | 55°47′09″N 6°15′37″W | | B | 12149 | Upload Photo |
| East Lodge And Gate-Way, Islay House Estate | | | 55°47′47″N 6°12′59″W | | B | 12153 | Upload Photo |
| Store-House (D. Macbranes) Port Askaig Pier | | | 55°50′55″N 6°06′18″W | | C(S) | 12166 | Upload Photo |
| John Francis Campbell Monument Rear St. Columba's Episcopal Church | | | 55°46′32″N 6°14′56″W | | C(S) | 12188 | Upload Photo |
| Dry Bridge Over Bridgend-Ballygrant Road, Islay House Estate | | | 55°46′58″N 6°14′57″W | | C(S) | 12145 | Upload Photo |
| Port Askaig Hotel | | | 55°50′52″N 6°06′20″W | | C(S) | 12162 | Upload Photo |
| Houses (F.T. Spears) Shop | | | 55°50′53″N 6°06′21″W | | C(S) | 12163 | Upload Photo |
| Port Askaig, Jetty | | | 55°50′53″N 6°06′17″W | | C(S) | 12164 | Upload Photo |
| Piermasters Shipping Office (D. Macbranes) House And Post Office Port Askaig | | | 55°50′54″N 6°06′18″W | | C(S) | 12165 | Upload Photo |
| Bridge, River Laggan Bowmore-Port Ellen Low Road | | | 55°43′51″N 6°17′11″W | | C(S) | 12430 | Upload Photo |
| Rhuvaal Lighthouse, Rudh A' Mhail | | | 55°56′11″N 6°07′25″W | | B | 12117 | Upload another image |
| Gardeners House And Gate Piers. Islay House Estate | | | 55°46′54″N 6°15′07″W | | C(S) | 12146 | Upload Photo |
| East Tower Near Gate-Lodge Islay House Estate | | | 55°46′55″N 6°15′06″W | | B | 12147 | Upload Photo |
| Eallabus House | | | 55°47′20″N 6°15′06″W | | B | 12150 | Upload Photo |
| Dunlossit House Estate, Memorial Cross (Shaft) | | | 55°50′50″N 6°06′32″W | | C(S) | 47367 | Upload Photo |
| Bridge House Beside Bridge Over River Laggan | | | 55°43′51″N 6°17′10″W | | C(S) | 12431 | Upload Photo |
| Kilarrow Parish Church, Main Street | | | 55°45′18″N 6°17′11″W | | A | 12184 | Upload another image |
| Islay Woollen Mill And Bridge | | | 55°47′22″N 6°13′30″W | | A | 12143 | Upload another image See more images |
| Emeraconart Cottage | | | 55°48′34″N 6°11′54″W | | C(S) | 12156 | Upload Photo |
| Dunlossit House | | | 55°50′45″N 6°06′15″W | | C(S) | 12160 | Upload Photo |
| Island House | | | 55°43′43″N 6°17′24″W | | B | 12187 | Upload Photo |
| West Tower, Islay House Estate | | | 55°47′02″N 6°16′24″W | | B | 12148 | Upload Photo |
| Newton House | | | 55°47′04″N 6°14′12″W | | C(S) | 12151 | Upload Photo |
| Daill House | | | 55°47′04″N 6°12′26″W | | B | 12152 | Upload Photo |
| Kilmeny (Former Manse) | | | 55°48′48″N 6°10′16″W | | B | 12155 | Upload Photo |
| Finlaggan Castle, Eilean Mor, Loch Finlaggan | | | 55°50′07″N 6°10′22″W | | C(S) | 12158 | Upload another image |
| Shore Street, House At Scws Filling Station | | | 55°45′26″N 6°17′11″W | | B | 12429 | Upload Photo |
| Bridge, River Sorn | | | 55°46′54″N 6°14′58″W | | B | 12191 | Upload Photo |
| Veterinary Surgery (Beside Bridge) River Sorn | | | 55°46′54″N 6°14′59″W | | B | 12141 | Upload Photo |
| 61 Jamieson Street, Cottage | | | 55°45′24″N 6°17′05″W | | C(S) | 12428 | Upload Photo |
| Islay House, Gateway At Entrance To Strand Legal Plantation | | | 55°46′54″N 6°15′05″W | | C(S) | 12432 | Upload Photo |
| Town Hall, Main Street | | | 55°45′21″N 6°17′13″W | | B | 12185 | Upload Photo |
| Cottage, (D. Gillies) 59-60 Jamieson Street | | | 55°45′24″N 6°17′05″W | | C(S) | 12186 | Upload Photo |
| Bunnahabhan Distillery, Bonahaven Bay | | | 55°52′58″N 6°07′34″W | | C(S) | 12116 | Upload Photo |
| Kilfinlaggan Chapel, Eilean Mor, Loch Finlaggan | | | 55°50′08″N 6°10′19″W | | C(S) | 12159 | Upload another image See more images |
| Bowmore Village, High Street, Former Free Church Including Perimeter Wall And Gatepiers | | | 55°45′22″N 6°17′03″W | | C(S) | 12947 | Upload Photo |
| Islay House | | | 55°47′05″N 6°15′15″W | | A | 12142 | Upload another image |
| Kilmeny Parish Church | | | 55°48′51″N 6°10′06″W | | B | 12154 | Upload Photo |
| Knocklearoch Farm-House And Steading | | | 55°48′26″N 6°09′09″W | | C(S) | 12157 | Upload Photo |
| Heatherhouse, Caol Ila | | | 55°51′04″N 6°07′04″W | | B | 12161 | Upload Photo |

== Key ==
The scheme for classifying buildings in Scotland is:

- Category A: "buildings of national or international importance, either architectural or historic; or fine, little-altered examples of some particular period, style or building type."
- Category B: "buildings of regional or more than local importance; or major examples of some particular period, style or building type, which may have been altered."
- Category C: "buildings of local importance; lesser examples of any period, style, or building type, as originally constructed or moderately altered; and simple traditional buildings which group well with other listed buildings."

In March 2016 there were 47,288 listed buildings in Scotland. Of these, 8% were Category A, and 50% were Category B, with the remaining 42% being Category C.

== See also ==
- List of listed buildings in Argyll and Bute
