= List of listed buildings in North Knapdale, Argyll and Bute =

This is a list of listed buildings in the parish of North Knapdale in Argyll and Bute, Scotland.

== List ==
Name	Location	Date Listed	Grid Ref. (Note: Sometimes known as OSGB36, the grid reference (where provided) is based on the British national grid reference system used by the Ordnance Survey. • "Guide to National Grid". Ordnance Survey. • "Get-a-map". Ordnance Survey.)	Geo-coordinates	Notes	LB Number (Note: Historic Environment Scotland assign a unique alphanumeric identifier to each designated site in Scotland, for listed buildings this always begins with "LB", for example "LB12345".)	Image
Bellanoch Village, Dolphins And Add View				56°04′29″N 5°32′29″W	Category B	19141	Upload Photo
Castle Sween, East Shore Of Loch Sween				55°56′52″N 5°39′56″W	Category A	18389	Upload another image
Crinan, K6 Telephone Kiosk				56°05′27″N 5°33′25″W	Category B	18390	Upload Photo
Bridge-Keeper's Cottage At Swing Bridge, Crinan Canal, Near Kilmahumaig				56°05′08″N 5°32′55″W	Category C(S)	18429	Upload Photo
St. Carmaig's Chapel, Keillsmore By Loch Na Cille				55°57′44″N 5°42′02″W	Category B	18433	Upload Photo
Crinan, 1, 2 Harbour House				56°05′16″N 5°33′55″W	Category B	19142	Upload Photo
North Knapdale Parish Church, Kilmichael Of Inverlussa				56°00′51″N 5°34′15″W	Category B	18427	Upload Photo
'Keills Cross', Beside St Carmaig's Chapel, Keillsmore By Loch Na Cille				55°57′45″N 5°42′03″W	Category B	18385	Upload Photo
Keills Port Quay To South				55°57′48″N 5°42′19″W	Category B	18387	Upload Photo
Taynish House By Loch Sween				55°59′13″N 5°38′53″W	Category B	18431	Upload Photo
Gun Room Taynish Estate				55°59′11″N 5°38′48″W	Category B	18432	Upload Photo
Farmhouse And Steading, Taynish Estate				55°59′11″N 5°38′50″W	Category B	19878	Upload Photo
North Knapdale Glebe Steading, Kilmichael Of Inverlussa				56°00′52″N 5°34′20″W	Category C(S)	18428	Upload Photo
Bellanoch Village Braeface Including Low Wing				56°04′29″N 5°32′25″W	Category B	47331	Upload Photo
Store-House And Lime-Kiln, Port Nan Gallan, By Loch Na Cille, Danna Island				55°57′16″N 5°41′49″W	Category C(S)	18388	Upload Photo
Bellanoch Village, Old Schoolhouse				56°04′29″N 5°32′26″W	Category B	19139	Upload Photo
Keills Port Quay To North				55°57′50″N 5°42′17″W	Category B	18386	Upload Photo
Inverlussa House (Formerly North Knapdale Manse)				56°00′51″N 5°34′20″W	Category B	18481	Upload Photo
Bellanoch Village, Cottage Row To The North Of Dolphins House				56°04′29″N 5°32′29″W	Category C(S)	19138	Upload Photo
Bellanoch Village, Smithy House				56°04′29″N 5°32′28″W	Category C(S)	19140	Upload Photo
Bellanoch Church Of Scotland				56°04′24″N 5°32′32″W	Category C(S)	18430	Upload Photo

== Key ==
The scheme for classifying buildings in Scotland is:

- Category A: "buildings of national or international importance, either architectural or historic; or fine, little-altered examples of some particular period, style or building type."
- Category B: "buildings of regional or more than local importance; or major examples of some particular period, style or building type, which may have been altered."
- Category C: "buildings of local importance; lesser examples of any period, style, or building type, as originally constructed or moderately altered; and simple traditional buildings which group well with other listed buildings."

In March 2016 there were 47,288 listed buildings in Scotland. Of these, 8% were Category A, and 50% were Category B, with the remaining 42% being Category C.

== See also ==
- List of listed buildings in Argyll and Bute
