= List of listed buildings in Glassary, Argyll and Bute =

This is a list of listed buildings in the parish of Glassary in Argyll and Bute, Scotland.

== List ==
Name	Location	Date listed	Geo-coordinates	Notes	Category	LB number	Image
Cairnbaan Hotel, Crinan Canal			56°03′41″N 5°28′20″W		B	11037	Upload Photo
Fionchairn Castle, By Loch Awe			56°11′08″N 5°23′17″W		B	11048	Upload another image
St. Bride's Chapel Kilbride Farm			56°06′52″N 5°27′30″W		B	11025	Upload Photo
Kilmichael Glassary Parish Church, Kilmichael Village			56°05′11″N 5°26′33″W		B	11033	Upload Photo
Clock Lodge, Lochgilphead-Lochgair Road			56°01′53″N 5°25′50″W		B	11040	Upload Photo
Stable House, Minard Estate			56°06′00″N 5°15′43″W		B	11046	Upload Photo
Argyll and Bute Hospital, Firgrove			56°02′36″N 5°25′05″W		C(S)	48640	Upload another image
Ice-House By Loch Ederline			56°10′15″N 5°26′02″W		C(S)	11051	Upload Photo
Kilmory Castle Home Farm Including Horse Exercise Ring			56°01′32″N 5°25′10″W		B	48295	Upload another image
Balliemore House, Kilmichael Village			56°05′00″N 5°26′53″W		C	11035	Upload another image
Lochgair Church Of Scotland			56°03′46″N 5°20′19″W		C(S)	11042	Upload Photo
Lochgair Sundial On Lawn Of Lochgair House, (Asknish)			56°04′14″N 5°19′42″W		B	11044	Upload Photo
St. Columba's Chapel, (Kilneuair Church), By Loch Awe			56°10′44″N 5°24′08″W		B	11049	Upload Photo
Rhudil Mill, Millers House			56°06′04″N 5°28′17″W		B	12924	Upload Photo
'Druim Na Vullen' Cuilarstich Burn, Near Lochgilphead			56°02′29″N 5°25′32″W		B	11038	Upload Photo
East Lodge, Poltalloch Estate, (Formerly)			56°06′25″N 5°29′54″W		B	11022	Upload Photo
Bridge (And Approach Walls) Kilmartin Burn, At East Lodge, Poltalloch Estate			56°06′25″N 5°29′55″W		B	11023	Upload Photo
Rhudil Mill, Rhudil Burn			56°06′04″N 5°28′17″W		B	11024	Upload Photo
Castleton House Including Gatepiers			56°00′25″N 5°23′56″W		C(S)	51096	Upload Photo
Kilmichael Bridge, River Add, Bridgend, Kilmichael Village			56°04′41″N 5°27′07″W		B	11036	Upload Photo
Catherine Castle Point. By Loch Gair			56°03′29″N 5°19′36″W		B	11041	Upload Photo
Lochgair House, (Asknish) By Loch Gair			56°04′17″N 5°19′47″W		B	11043	Upload another image
'Oratory' Beside Kilneuair Church			56°10′44″N 5°24′10″W		B	11050	Upload Photo
Kilmichael Churchyard Wall, Kilmichael Village			56°05′11″N 5°26′35″W		B	11034	Upload Photo
Kilmory Castle			56°01′33″N 5°25′18″W		B	11039	Upload another image
Minard Castle Hotel By Loch Fyne			56°05′53″N 5°15′38″W		B	11045	Upload another image
Minard Castle Wood, Folly			56°05′51″N 5°16′04″W		C(S)	50812	Upload Photo
Cumlodden Church Of Scotland			56°08′53″N 5°11′50″W		C(S)	11047	Upload Photo

== Key ==
The scheme for classifying buildings in Scotland is:

- Category A: "buildings of national or international importance, either architectural or historic; or fine, little-altered examples of some particular period, style or building type."
- Category B: "buildings of regional or more than local importance; or major examples of some particular period, style or building type, which may have been altered."
- Category C: "buildings of local importance; lesser examples of any period, style, or building type, as originally constructed or moderately altered; and simple traditional buildings which group well with other listed buildings."

In March 2016 there were 47,288 listed buildings in Scotland. Of these, 8% were Category A, and 50% were Category B, with the remaining 42% being Category C.

== See also ==
- List of listed buildings in Argyll and Bute
