= List of listed buildings in Kilninver and Kilmelford, Argyll and Bute =

This is a list of listed buildings in the parish of Kilninver And Kilmelford in Argyll and Bute, Scotland.

== List ==
| Name | Location | Date Listed | Grid Ref. (Note: Sometimes known as OSGB36, the grid reference (where provided) is based on the British national grid reference system used by the Ordnance Survey. • "Guide to National Grid". Ordnance Survey. • "Get-a-map". Ordnance Survey.) | Geo-coordinates | Notes | LB Number (Note: Historic Environment Scotland assign a unique alphanumeric identifier to each designated site in Scotland, for listed buildings this always begins with "LB", for example "LB12345".) | Image |
|---|---|---|---|---|---|---|---|
| Kilninver, K6 Telephone Kiosk At Croft Museum | | | | 56°20′18″N 5°31′22″W | Category B | 11837 | Upload another image |
| Kilmelfort Kirk, Cuil Fail | | | | 56°15′38″N 5°28′27″W | Category C(S) | 11836 | Upload another image See more images |
| Kilninver Kirk | | | | 56°20′15″N 5°31′13″W | Category C(S) | 11832 | Upload Photo |
| Clachan Farm-House | | | | 56°18′53″N 5°34′50″W | Category C(S) | 11833 | Upload Photo |
| Clachan Bridge (Bridge over the Atlantic), Sound Of Seil | | | | 56°19′04″N 5°34′58″W | Category A | 11834 | Upload another image See more images |
| Bragleenbeg Farmhouse | | | | 56°19′44″N 5°22′55″W | Category C(S) | 11835 | Upload Photo |
| Glenmore Farm Steading | | | | 56°15′15″N 5°28′30″W | Category C(S) | 50989 | Upload another image |

== Key ==
The scheme for classifying buildings in Scotland is:

- Category A: "buildings of national or international importance, either architectural or historic; or fine, little-altered examples of some particular period, style or building type."
- Category B: "buildings of regional or more than local importance; or major examples of some particular period, style or building type, which may have been altered."
- Category C: "buildings of local importance; lesser examples of any period, style, or building type, as originally constructed or moderately altered; and simple traditional buildings which group well with other listed buildings."

In March 2016 there were 47,288 listed buildings in Scotland. Of these, 8% were Category A, and 50% were Category B, with the remaining 42% being Category C.

== See also ==
- List of listed buildings in Argyll and Bute
