= List of listed buildings in Saddell And Skipness, Argyll and Bute =

This is a list of listed buildings in the parish of Saddell And Skipness in Argyll and Bute, Scotland.

== List ==
Name	Location	Date Listed	Grid Ref. (Note: Sometimes known as OSGB36, the grid reference (where provided) is based on the British national grid reference system used by the Ordnance Survey. • "Guide to National Grid". Ordnance Survey. • "Get-a-map". Ordnance Survey.)	Geo-coordinates	Notes	LB Number (Note: Historic Environment Scotland assign a unique alphanumeric identifier to each designated site in Scotland, for listed buildings this always begins with "LB", for example "LB12345".)	Image
Bridge I, Lephin Corrach Burn, Torrisdale Estate				55°34′03″N 5°30′06″W	Category C(S)	18398	Upload Photo
Saddell Burial Ground, Campbell Of Glen Carradale Burial Enclosure				55°31′55″N 5°30′42″W	Category C(S)	18482	Upload Photo
Cour House Saddell				55°40′40″N 5°27′48″W	Category A	18360	Upload Photo
Saddell Abbey				55°31′55″N 5°30′43″W	Category B	18402	Upload Photo
Gate-Lodge And Gate-Way Skipness Estate				55°46′08″N 5°20′37″W	Category C(S)	18358	Upload Photo
Torrisdale Castle				55°34′08″N 5°30′05″W	Category B	18396	Upload Photo
Torrisdale Gate-Lodge And Gateway Torrisdale Estate Saddell - Skipness Road				55°33′58″N 5°29′46″W	Category B	18400	Upload Photo
Saddell Castle				55°31′39″N 5°30′17″W	Category A	18403	Upload another image
Saddell House				55°31′47″N 5°30′05″W	Category B	18404	Upload Photo
St. Brendan's Church Of Scotland Skipness Village				55°46′07″N 5°20′40″W	Category C(S)	18359	Upload Photo
Saddell Parish Church, Dippen				55°34′59″N 5°29′55″W	Category C(S)	18392	Upload Photo
Grogport House (Grogport Old Manse)				55°38′05″N 5°28′48″W	Category B	18405	Upload Photo
Gate-House And Stable ('The Arch') Near Torresdale Castle				55°34′06″N 5°30′10″W	Category B	18397	Upload Photo
Carradale House				55°35′03″N 5°28′54″W	Category B	18394	Upload Photo
Bridge Ii, Torrisdale Estate				55°34′08″N 5°30′00″W	Category C(S)	18399	Upload Photo
Glenreasdell Mains Claonaig - Tarbert Road				55°46′17″N 5°24′28″W	Category C(S)	18407	Upload Photo
Torrisdale Square				55°34′18″N 5°29′48″W	Category B	18395	Upload Photo
Torrisdale Bridge Torrisdale Water Saddell - Skipness Road				55°33′59″N 5°29′45″W	Category B	18401	Upload Photo
Skipness Castle				55°46′05″N 5°20′10″W	Category A	18408	Upload another image
St. Brendan's Chapel (Kilbrannan) Skipness Estate				55°45′57″N 5°19′57″W	Category A	18409	Upload another image
Dippen Bridge, Carradale Water, Saddell - Skipness Road, Dippen				55°34′56″N 5°29′43″W	Category B	18393	Upload Photo
Skipness Parish Church Claonaig				55°45′23″N 5°23′42″W	Category B	18406	Upload Photo
Saddell Burial Ground, Campbell Of Glen Saddell Burial Enclosure				55°31′55″N 5°30′46″W	Category B	18483	Upload Photo

== Key ==
The scheme for classifying buildings in Scotland is:

- Category A: "buildings of national or international importance, either architectural or historic; or fine, little-altered examples of some particular period, style or building type."
- Category B: "buildings of regional or more than local importance; or major examples of some particular period, style or building type, which may have been altered."
- Category C: "buildings of local importance; lesser examples of any period, style, or building type, as originally constructed or moderately altered; and simple traditional buildings which group well with other listed buildings."

In March 2016 there were 47,288 listed buildings in Scotland. Of these, 8% were Category A, and 50% were Category B, with the remaining 42% being Category C.

== See also ==
- List of listed buildings in Argyll and Bute
