= List of listed buildings in Southend, Argyll and Bute =

This is a list of listed buildings in the parish of Southend in Argyll and Bute, Scotland.

== List ==
| Name | Location | Date Listed | Grid Ref. (Note: Sometimes known as OSGB36, the grid reference (where provided) is based on the British national grid reference system used by the Ordnance Survey. • "Guide to National Grid". Ordnance Survey. • "Get-a-map". Ordnance Survey.) | Geo-coordinates | Notes | LB Number (Note: Historic Environment Scotland assign a unique alphanumeric identifier to each designated site in Scotland, for listed buildings this always begins with "LB", for example "LB12345".) | Image |
|---|---|---|---|---|---|---|---|
| Machrimore Mill Machrimore | | | | 55°19′24″N 5°37′31″W | Category B | 18339 | Upload Photo |
| Macharioch House | | | | 55°19′30″N 5°34′18″W | Category B | 18342 | Upload Photo |
| Lephenstrath House | | | | 55°18′51″N 5°41′21″W | Category B | 18349 | Upload Photo |
| St Ninian's Church Sanda Island | | | | 55°16′58″N 5°34′48″W | Category B | 18353 | Upload Photo |
| Dunaverty Memorial Burial Enclosure | | | | 55°18′47″N 5°38′49″W | Category C(S) | 18355 | Upload Photo |
| St Columba's Chapel Kilcolmkill Burial Ground, Keil | | | | 55°18′30″N 5°40′03″W | Category B | 18346 | Upload Photo |
| Gate Lodge And Gate-Piers Macharioch House Policies | | | | 55°19′32″N 5°34′27″W | Category B | 18344 | Upload Photo |
| St Columba's Church Of Scotland Southend Village | | | | 55°18′59″N 5°38′28″W | Category B | 18345 | Upload Photo |
| Lephenstrath Farmhouse | | | | 55°18′52″N 5°41′08″W | Category C(S) | 18350 | Upload Photo |
| Carskiey Doocots | | | | 55°18′36″N 5°41′47″W | Category B | 18354 | Upload Photo |
| Southend Manse, Machrimore | | | | 55°19′37″N 5°37′53″W | Category C(S) | 18338 | Upload Photo |
| Machrimore Smiddy | | | | 55°19′26″N 5°37′29″W | Category B | 18340 | Upload Photo |
| Machrimore Smiddy, Smithy's House | | | | 55°19′26″N 5°37′31″W | Category C(S) | 18341 | Upload Photo |
| Mull Of Kintyre Lighthouse | | | | 55°18′38″N 5°48′12″W | Category A | 19874 | Upload another image |
| Southend Parish Church (St Blaan's), Machrimore | | | | 55°19′31″N 5°37′46″W | Category B | 18337 | Upload Photo |
| Gartvaigh Farmhouse | | | | 55°18′57″N 5°40′22″W | Category C(S) | 18347 | Upload Photo |
| Kennels, Beside Macharioch House | | | | 55°19′32″N 5°34′18″W | Category C(S) | 18343 | Upload Photo |
| Carskiey House | | | | 55°18′36″N 5°41′50″W | Category B | 18351 | Upload Photo |
| Lephenstrath Bridge Breackerie Water | | | | 55°19′14″N 5°40′52″W | Category B | 18348 | Upload Photo |
| Carskiey, Gate Lodge And Gatepiers, Carskiey Estate | | | | 55°18′39″N 5°41′37″W | Category B | 18352 | Upload Photo |

== Key ==
The scheme for classifying buildings in Scotland is:

- Category A: "buildings of national or international importance, either architectural or historic; or fine, little-altered examples of some particular period, style or building type."
- Category B: "buildings of regional or more than local importance; or major examples of some particular period, style or building type, which may have been altered."
- Category C: "buildings of local importance; lesser examples of any period, style, or building type, as originally constructed or moderately altered; and simple traditional buildings which group well with other listed buildings."

In March 2016 there were 47,288 listed buildings in Scotland. Of these, 8% were Category A, and 50% were Category B, with the remaining 42% being Category C.

== See also ==
- List of listed buildings in Argyll and Bute
