= List of listed buildings in Cardross =

This is a list of listed buildings in the parish of Cardross, in Argyll and Bute, Scotland.

== List ==
Name	Location	Date Listed	Grid Ref. (Note: Sometimes known as OSGB36, the grid reference (where provided) is based on the British national grid reference system used by the Ordnance Survey. • "Guide to National Grid". Ordnance Survey. • "Get-a-map". Ordnance Survey.)	Geo-coordinates	Notes	LB Number (Note: Historic Environment Scotland assign a unique alphanumeric identifier to each designated site in Scotland, for listed buildings this always begins with "LB", for example "LB12345".)	Image
Cardross, Brook's Road, Moorpark Cottage				55°57′57″N 4°40′17″W	Category C(S)	42900	Upload Photo
Cardross, Cardross Park With Walled Garden, Gates, Gatepiers And Boundary Wall				55°57′51″N 4°39′09″W	Category B	42902	Upload Photo
Cardross, Low Auchensail Farmhouse And Steading				55°58′50″N 4°39′30″W	Category C(S)	42908	Upload Photo
Cardross, Red Road, West Lodge With Gates And Gatepiers				55°58′40″N 4°40′29″W	Category C(S)	42916	Upload Photo
Cardross, Kilmahew South Lodge With Gatepiers				55°57′51″N 4°38′24″W	Category B	6685	Upload Photo
Cardross, Ardoch With Garden Wall, Gatepiers And Boundary Wall				55°57′07″N 4°37′18″W	Category B	129	Upload Photo
Cardross, Ardmore House, Stable Block				55°58′14″N 4°41′46″W	Category C(S)	42896	Upload Photo
Cardross, Main Road, Cardross Golf Club				55°57′41″N 4°38′55″W	Category B	42910	Upload Photo
Cardross, Main Road, Shira Lodge With Boundary Wall And Gatepiers				55°57′39″N 4°38′49″W	Category C(S)	42912	Upload Photo
Cardross, Auchinfroe With Stables, Gatepiers And Railings				55°57′47″N 4°38′44″W	Category B	1156	Upload Photo
Colgrain, Camis Eskan Dovecot				55°59′41″N 4°41′40″W	Category B	1167	Upload Photo
Colgrain, Camis Eskan				55°59′48″N 4°41′38″W	Category B	1169	Upload another image
Colgrain, Camis Eskan, Walled Garden				55°59′41″N 4°41′46″W	Category C(S)	1175	Upload Photo
Cardross, Geilston House With Walled Garden And Green House				55°58′07″N 4°39′40″W	Category B	1181	Upload another image See more images
Cardross, Main Road, Former Corn Mill				55°57′32″N 4°38′41″W	Category C(S)	43882	Upload Photo
Cardross, Brook's Road, Moorpark House				55°57′58″N 4°40′20″W	Category B	42901	Upload Photo
Cardross, Ardmore House, East Lodge With Gates And Railings				55°58′17″N 4°41′18″W	Category C(S)	1160	Upload Photo
Colgrain, Keppoch House With Walled Gardens, Gatepiers, Gates And Boundary Walls				55°58′45″N 4°40′55″W	Category B	1166	Upload Photo
Cardross, Kilmahew Castle				55°58′21″N 4°38′34″W	Category B	1177	Upload Photo
Cardross, Brook's Road, Moorpark, Former Coach House To Moorpark House With Boundary Wall And Gatepiers				55°57′59″N 4°40′18″W	Category C(S)	42899	Upload Photo
Cardross, Carman Road, Bloomhill With Lodge And Gatepiers				55°57′36″N 4°38′39″W	Category C(S)	42904	Upload Photo
Cardross, Drumhead House With Stable Block, Walled Garden				55°58′38″N 4°39′53″W	Category B	42906	Upload Photo
Cardross, Main Road, Geilston Hall				55°57′59″N 4°39′36″W	Category C(S)	42911	Upload another image
Cardross, Main Road, War Memorial				55°57′46″N 4°39′10″W	Category B	42914	Upload Photo
Cardross, Main Road, The White House With Boundary Wall				55°57′34″N 4°38′43″W	Category C(S)	1153	Upload Photo
Cardross, Ardochmore, Barn				55°57′25″N 4°37′26″W	Category B	1157	Upload Photo
Cardross, Lyleston House With Boundary Walls, Gatepiers And Walled Garden				55°58′44″N 4°40′35″W	Category C(S)	1180	Upload Photo
Colgrain, Drumfork House				56°00′01″N 4°42′36″W	Category B	42919	Upload Photo
Cardross, Main Road, Moore's Bridge				55°57′39″N 4°38′51″W	Category C(S)	1155	Upload Photo
Cardross, Ardmore House With Observatory Tower And Circular Building				55°58′18″N 4°41′57″W	Category B	1159	Upload Photo
Colgrain, Camis Eskan West Lodge With Boundary Wall And Gatepiers				55°59′42″N 4°42′18″W	Category B	1138	Upload Photo
Cardross, Main Road, Manse With Boundary Wall And Gatepiers				55°57′36″N 4°38′43″W	Category C(S)	128	Upload Photo
Cardross, Brook's Road, Brooks House				55°58′02″N 4°40′24″W	Category B	42898	Upload Photo
Cardross, Main Road, Water Fountain				55°57′46″N 4°39′10″W	Category C(S)	42915	Upload Photo
Cardross, Station Road, Parish Church With Boundary Wall And Gatepiers				55°57′44″N 4°39′13″W	Category B	42917	Upload another image
Cardross, Station Road, Railway Station				55°57′37″N 4°39′11″W	Category C(S)	42918	Upload another image
Cardross Kilmahew Estate, St Peter's College				55°58′13″N 4°38′26″W	Category A	6464	Upload Photo
Cardross, Geilston House, Stables				55°58′09″N 4°39′47″W	Category C(S)	1182	Upload another image
Cardross, Geilston House, Dovecot				55°58′08″N 4°39′46″W	Category B	1183	Upload another image
Cardross, Darleith Road, Saint Mahew's Chapel				55°58′19″N 4°39′30″W	Category A	42905	Upload another image See more images
Cardross, Drumhead House, Main Lodge With Gates And Gatepiers				55°58′26″N 4°39′47″W	Category C(S)	42907	Upload Photo
Cardross, Main Road, Ardenvohr With Boundary Wall And Gatepiers				55°57′40″N 4°38′59″W	Category C(S)	42909	Upload Photo
Cardross, Ardoch Gardens				55°57′13″N 4°37′35″W	Category C(S)	1158	Upload Photo
Colgrain, Camis Eskan East Lodge With Gates, Boundary Wall And Railings				55°59′11″N 4°41′21″W	Category B	1170	Upload Photo
Cardross, Auchinfroe Lodge With Gates And Gatepiers				55°57′40″N 4°38′52″W	Category C(S)	42897	Upload Photo
Cardross, Cardross Road, Cats Castle				55°56′55″N 4°36′29″W	Category B	42903	Upload Photo
Cardross, Main Road, Former Parish Church With Graveyard And Boundary Walls				55°57′36″N 4°38′45″W	Category B	1152	Upload Photo
Cardross, Ardmore House, Tower				55°58′14″N 4°42′01″W	Category B	1165	Upload Photo

== Key ==
The scheme for classifying buildings in Scotland is:

- Category A: "buildings of national or international importance, either architectural or historic; or fine, little-altered examples of some particular period, style or building type."
- Category B: "buildings of regional or more than local importance; or major examples of some particular period, style or building type, which may have been altered."
- Category C: "buildings of local importance; lesser examples of any period, style, or building type, as originally constructed or moderately altered; and simple traditional buildings which group well with other listed buildings."

In March 2016 there were 47,288 listed buildings in Scotland. Of these, 8% were Category A, and 50% were Category B, with the remaining 42% being Category C.

== See also ==
- List of listed buildings in Argyll and Bute
