= List of listed buildings in Rhu, Argyll =

This is a list of listed buildings in the parish of Rhu in Argyll and Bute, Scotland.

== List ==
| Name | Location | Date Listed | Grid Ref. (Note: Sometimes known as OSGB36, the grid reference (where provided) is based on the British national grid reference system used by the Ordnance Survey. • "Guide to National Grid". Ordnance Survey. • "Get-a-map". Ordnance Survey.) | Geo-coordinates | Notes | LB Number (Note: Historic Environment Scotland assign a unique alphanumeric identifier to each designated site in Scotland, for listed buildings this always begins with "LB", for example "LB12345".) | Image |
|---|---|---|---|---|---|---|---|
| Rhu Village, Pier Road, Rowmore With Terrace Balustrade, Gatepiers, Railings, And Outbuildings | | | | 56°00′57″N 4°46′35″W | Category B | 19521 | Upload Photo |
| Rhu Village, Pier Road, Woodstone Cottage And Stables | | | | 56°00′54″N 4°46′26″W | Category C(S) | 19523 | Upload Photo |
| Shandon, Shore Road, Aldonaig With Outbuildings | | | | 56°01′19″N 4°47′06″W | Category C(S) | 19538 | Upload Photo |
| Rhu Village, Church Road, Rhu And Shandon Parish Church With Graveyard Sundial, Boundary Wall And Gatepiers | | | | 56°01′03″N 4°46′51″W | Category B | 19498 | Upload another image See more images |
| Rhu Village, Cumberland Ave, 1-10 (Inclusive Nos) Cumberland Terrace, With Perimeter Walls And Gatepiers | | | | 56°01′06″N 4°46′46″W | Category B | 19500 | Upload Photo |
| Rhu Village, Cumberland Road, Gare Cottage, Gate, Gatepiers And Boundary Wall | | | | 56°01′07″N 4°46′48″W | Category C(S) | 19501 | Upload Photo |
| Rhu Village, Gareloch Road, The Cottage | | | | 56°00′58″N 4°46′39″W | Category C(S) | 19505 | Upload Photo |
| Rhu Village, Gareloch Road, Royal Northern Yacht Club (Formerly Ardenvohr) With Terrace And Balustrade | | | | 56°01′03″N 4°47′00″W | Category B | 19507 | Upload another image |
| Rhu Village, Gareloch Road, Royal Northern Yacht Club, Lodge, Gates, Gatepiers And Boundary Wall And Railings | | | | 56°01′00″N 4°46′54″W | Category B | 19508 | Upload Photo |
| Rhu Village, Glenarn Road, Glenarn House With Coach House, Garden House And Gatepiers | | | | 56°01′07″N 4°46′11″W | Category B | 19510 | Upload another image |
| Shandon, Shore Road, Stuckenduff Coach House And Walled Garden (Formerly Part Of Ardgare Estate) | | | | 56°02′05″N 4°47′53″W | Category C(S) | 18969 | Upload Photo |
| Shandon, Shore Road, Cragmore With Winter Garden And Balustraded Parapet | | | | 56°02′40″N 4°48′18″W | Category B | 18791 | Upload Photo |
| Shandon, Shore Road, Croy With Terrace, Stables And Outbuildings | | | | 56°01′53″N 4°47′40″W | Category B | 18544 | Upload Photo |
| Shandon, Shore Road, Lagbuie And Boundary Wall | | | | 56°02′43″N 4°48′21″W | Category C(S) | 18550 | Upload Photo |
| Finnart, Arrochar Road, Ardarroch House | | | | 56°06′56″N 4°50′05″W | Category B | 14438 | Upload Photo |
| Garelochhead Village, Main Street, Rock House, Gatepiers And Boundary Walls | | | | 56°04′47″N 4°49′48″W | Category C(S) | 14494 | Upload Photo |
| Garelochhead, Station Road, Station Master's House With Retaining Wall And Railings | | | | 56°04′46″N 4°49′34″W | Category B | 14496 | Upload Photo |
| Garelochhead Village, Shore Road, Argyll House With Boundary Wall And Gatepiers | | | | 56°04′37″N 4°50′21″W | Category C(S) | 42640 | Upload Photo |
| Rhu Village, 15-37 (Inclusive Odd Nos) Manse Brae, Braehouse With Boundary Walls | | | | 56°01′04″N 4°46′45″W | Category B | 19514 | Upload Photo |
| Rhu Village, Torwoodhill Road, Clifton With Stables, Greenhouses And Boundary Wall | | | | 56°00′57″N 4°45′58″W | Category B | 19529 | Upload Photo |
| Rhu Village, Torwoodhill Road, 'Hazelwood' Including Motor House Incorporating Former Stable, Boundary Walls And Gatepiers | | | | 56°00′57″N 4°46′01″W | Category C(S) | 19530 | Upload Photo |
| Rhu Village, Torwoodhill Road, Torwood | | | | 56°01′00″N 4°46′00″W | Category B | 19533 | Upload Photo |
| Rhu Village, Torwoodhill Road, Torwoodhill With Conservatory And Stables | | | | 56°00′54″N 4°45′50″W | Category C(S) | 19534 | Upload Photo |
| Rhu Village, Church Road, Greenside And Railings | | | | 56°01′01″N 4°46′49″W | Category C(S) | 19497 | Upload Photo |
| Rhu Village, 49 Gareloch Road, Rhu Inn | | | | 56°01′00″N 4°46′47″W | Category B | 19502 | Upload Photo |
| Rhu Village, Gareloch Road, Ardenvohr Estate, Former Stable With Tower, Greenhouses, Gates And Gatepiers | | | | 56°01′08″N 4°47′03″W | Category B | 19503 | Upload Photo |
| Whistlefield, House With Gatepiers And Railings | | | | 56°05′50″N 4°50′20″W | Category C(S) | 18971 | Upload Photo |
| Shandon, Shore Road, Ardchapel With Stables | | | | 56°02′13″N 4°48′00″W | Category C(S) | 18786 | Upload Photo |
| Rhu Village, Pier Road, Laggary Lodge | | | | 56°01′03″N 4°46′28″W | Category C(S) | 19520 | Upload Photo |
| Rhu Village, Rhu Road, Armadale | | | | 56°00′51″N 4°46′11″W | Category B | 19524 | Upload Photo |
| Rhu Village, Rhu Road Lower, Ardencaple Hotel With Former Stables, Cottage Outbuildings And Boundary Wall | | | | 56°00′48″N 4°45′52″W | Category A | 19525 | Upload another image |
| Rhu Village, Station Road, Aughengare (Also Including "The Corner") | | | | 56°01′13″N 4°46′28″W | Category C(S) | 19526 | Upload Photo |
| Shandon, Gullybridge War Memorial | | | | 56°01′44″N 4°47′34″W | Category C(S) | 19536 | Upload Photo |
| Garelochhead, Station Road, Garelochhead Station With Control Box, Subway And Gates | | | | 56°04′48″N 4°49′32″W | Category B | 19490 | Upload Photo |
| Rhu Village, Armadale Road, Torwood Cottage | | | | 56°00′55″N 4°46′06″W | Category B | 19493 | Upload Photo |
| Shandon, Shore Road, Oakbank | | | | 56°02′43″N 4°48′26″W | Category C(S) | 18540 | Upload Photo |
| Shandon, Shore Road, Letrault With Stables And Gatepiers | | | | 56°02′17″N 4°48′04″W | Category B | 18551 | Upload Photo |
| Faslane, St Michael's Chapel Including Graveyard With Caretaker's Lodge And Variety Of 20Th Century Grave Monuments And Sundial | | | | 56°04′11″N 4°48′54″W | Category B | 14437 | Upload Photo |
| Finnart, Arrochar Road, Finnart House | | | | 56°06′58″N 4°49′47″W | Category B | 14440 | Upload Photo |
| Finnart, Arrochar Road, Glenmallen House, Stables And Gatepiers | | | | 56°07′35″N 4°49′03″W | Category B | 14442 | Upload Photo |
| Rhu Village, Torwoodhill Road, Former Lodge To Torwoodhill | | | | 56°00′53″N 4°45′55″W | Category C(S) | 19535 | Upload Photo |
| Portincaple, Feuins Road, Dalriada With Garden House And Garden Wall | | | | 56°05′51″N 4°50′28″W | Category B | 19491 | Upload Photo |
| Rhu Village, Church Road (Off), War Memorial And Boundary Wall | | | | 56°01′01″N 4°46′52″W | Category C(S) | 19499 | Upload Photo |
| Rhu Village, Gareloch Road, Clarinish With Former Stables | | | | 56°01′16″N 4°47′05″W | Category C(S) | 19504 | Upload Photo |
| Shandon, Shore Road, Blairvadoch With Terrace, Laundry Block, And Outbuilding | | | | 56°01′46″N 4°47′23″W | Category B | 18789 | Upload Photo |
| Shandon, Shore Road, Glenfeulan With Conservatory, Garage Court, Walls And Piers | | | | 56°02′38″N 4°48′15″W | Category B | 18546 | Upload Photo |
| Shandon, Shore Road, Linnburn With Terrace And Boundary Wall And Gatepiers | | | | 56°02′29″N 4°48′13″W | Category B | 18553 | Upload Photo |
| Garelochhead Village, Garelochhead Primary School With Boundary Wall And Gatepiers | | | | 56°04′57″N 4°49′56″W | Category C(S) | 14428 | Upload Photo |
| Faslane Clyde Submarine Base, Belmore House | | | | 56°03′51″N 4°48′54″W | Category B | 14436 | Upload Photo |
| Garelochhead Village, Garelochhead Church With Boundary Wall And Gatepiers | | | | 56°04′51″N 4°49′50″W | Category B | 14443 | Upload Photo |
| Rhu Village, Pier Road, Dalarne And Orwell Lodge With Gatepiers And Boundary Wall | | | | 56°01′05″N 4°46′33″W | Category B | 19518 | Upload Photo |
| Portincaple, The Shore, Inverallt | | | | 56°06′14″N 4°50′36″W | Category B | 19492 | Upload Photo |
| Rhu Village, Aros Road, Aros | | | | 56°01′28″N 4°47′05″W | Category B | 19494 | Upload Photo |
| Rhu Village, Gareloch Road, Row House | | | | 56°01′00″N 4°46′46″W | Category B | 19506 | Upload Photo |
| Rhu Village, Gareloch Road/Church Road Upper Craigvad With Boundary Wall And Railing | | | | 56°01′01″N 4°46′49″W | Category C(S) | 19509 | Upload Photo |
| Rhu Village, Hall Road, Rhu Community Education Centre And Boundary Wall | | | | 56°01′09″N 4°46′53″W | Category B | 19513 | Upload Photo |
| Shandon, Shore Road, Shandon House | | | | 56°02′51″N 4°48′32″W | Category B | 18542 | Upload Photo |
| Shandon, Shore Road, Inverallt With Garden Pavilions, Boundary Wall And Gatepiers | | | | 56°02′44″N 4°48′30″W | Category B | 18547 | Upload Photo |
| Rhu Village, Church Road, 1-6, Ardwell Place | | | | 56°01′02″N 4°46′50″W | Category B | 19496 | Upload Photo |
| Shandon, Shore Road, Alt-Na-Coille | | | | 56°02′21″N 4°48′08″W | Category C(S) | 18784 | Upload Photo |
| Shandon, Shore Road, Old Shandon Free Church With Boundary Wall And Gatepiers | | | | 56°02′24″N 4°48′12″W | Category C(S) | 18541 | Upload Photo |
| Shandon, Shore Road, Stuckenduff | | | | 56°02′02″N 4°47′55″W | Category B | 18543 | Upload Photo |
| Shandon, Shore Road, Inverallt Cottage And Boundary Wall | | | | 56°02′44″N 4°48′27″W | Category C(S) | 18548 | Upload Photo |
| Finnart, Arrochar Road, Ardarroch House, East Lodge | | | | 56°06′55″N 4°50′00″W | Category C(S) | 14439 | Upload Photo |
| Rhu Village, Manse Brae, Ardenconnel Coach-House | | | | 56°01′19″N 4°46′45″W | Category C(S) | 19515 | Upload Photo |
| Rhu Village, Pier Road, Woodcote With Stables, Gatepiers And Boundary Wall | | | | 56°01′02″N 4°46′32″W | Category B | 19522 | Upload Photo |
| Shandon, Queen's Point, Croy Lodge (Formerly To Croy) | | | | 56°01′56″N 4°47′49″W | Category C(S) | 19537 | Upload Photo |
| Rhu Village, Artarman Road, Artarman With Gatepiers | | | | 56°00′57″N 4°46′12″W | Category B | 19495 | Upload Photo |
| Shandon, Shore Road, Ardlarich With Gateway | | | | 56°01′31″N 4°47′07″W | Category B | 18787 | Upload Photo |
| Shandon, Shore Road, The Gables | | | | 56°02′42″N 4°48′19″W | Category B | 18545 | Upload Photo |
| Garelochhead Village, Lilybank With E Entrance Gate And Garden Gate | | | | 56°04′50″N 4°49′49″W | Category C(S) | 14429 | Upload Photo |
| Garelochhead Village, The Shore, Elderberry Cottage And Boundary Wall | | | | 56°04′48″N 4°49′51″W | Category C(S) | 14495 | Upload Photo |
| Strone Camp, Anti-Submarine Artillery Testing Tank | | | | 56°04′27″N 4°47′19″W | Category B | 51003 | Upload Photo |
| Rhu Village, Manse Brae(Off), Ardenconnel House | | | | 56°01′16″N 4°46′48″W | Category B | 19516 | Upload Photo |
| Rhu Village, Pier Road, Ardenmohr | | | | 56°00′52″N 4°46′28″W | Category C(S) | 19517 | Upload Photo |
| Rhu Village, Pier Road, Laggary House | | | | 56°01′05″N 4°46′19″W | Category B | 19519 | Upload Photo |
| Rhu Village, Station Road, Dunard With Gatepiers And Boundary Wall | | | | 56°01′12″N 4°46′24″W | Category C(S) | 19527 | Upload Photo |
| Rhu Village, Torwoodhill Road, Carpeath | | | | 56°01′00″N 4°46′05″W | Category B | 19528 | Upload Photo |
| Rhu Village, Torwoodhill Road, Lagarie | | | | 56°00′50″N 4°45′59″W | Category B | 19531 | Upload Photo |
| Rhu Village, Torwoodhill Road, Torbaan (Formerly Auchenlea) | | | | 56°00′55″N 4°45′58″W | Category B | 19532 | Upload Photo |
| Rhu Village, Glenarn Road, Invergare (Formerly Rowalyn) With Balustrade And Gatepiers | | | | 56°01′02″N 4°46′09″W | Category B | 19511 | Upload Photo |
| Rhu Village, Hall Road, The Anchorage | | | | 56°01′08″N 4°46′55″W | Category C(S) | 19512 | Upload Photo |
| Shandon, Shore Road, South Lodge (Formerly Lodge To West Shandon) | | | | 56°02′54″N 4°48′43″W | Category B | 18970 | Upload Photo |
| Shandon, Shore Road, The Manse (Formerly To Shandon Free Church) With Gates And Boundary Wall | | | | 56°02′23″N 4°48′11″W | Category C(S) | 18539 | Upload Photo |
| Finnart, Arrochar Road, Finnart Lodge With Boundary Wall | | | | 56°06′53″N 4°49′59″W | Category B | 14441 | Upload Photo |

== Key ==
The scheme for classifying buildings in Scotland is:

- Category A: "buildings of national or international importance, either architectural or historic; or fine, little-altered examples of some particular period, style or building type."
- Category B: "buildings of regional or more than local importance; or major examples of some particular period, style or building type, which may have been altered."
- Category C: "buildings of local importance; lesser examples of any period, style, or building type, as originally constructed or moderately altered; and simple traditional buildings which group well with other listed buildings."

In March 2016 there were 47,288 listed buildings in Scotland. Of these, 8% were Category A, and 50% were Category B, with the remaining 42% being Category C.

== See also ==
- List of listed buildings in Argyll and Bute
