= List of listed buildings in Gigha And Cara, Argyll and Bute =

This is a list of listed buildings in the parish of Gigha And Cara in Argyll and Bute, Scotland.

== List ==
Name	Location	Date Listed	Grid Ref. (Note: Sometimes known as OSGB36, the grid reference (where provided) is based on the British national grid reference system used by the Ordnance Survey. • "Guide to National Grid". Ordnance Survey. • "Get-a-map". Ordnance Survey.)	Geo-coordinates	Notes	LB Number (Note: Historic Environment Scotland assign a unique alphanumeric identifier to each designated site in Scotland, for listed buildings this always begins with "LB", for example "LB12345".)	Image
Achamore House	Gigha	20/07/1971		55°40′01″N 5°45′00″W	Category B	11449	Upload another image See more images
Achamore Farm-House And Steading				55°39′52″N 5°45′13″W	Category B	11426	Upload Photo
Cara Chapel (St. Finla's)				55°38′06″N 5°44′59″W	Category B	11430	Upload Photo
Boundary Wall (With 2 Gate-Ways), Kilchattan Burial Ground	Gigha	28/08/1980		55°40′08″N 5°44′57″W	Category C(S)	11448	Upload another image See more images
Gigha Hotel Ardmenish	Ardminish	20/07/1971		55°40′29″N 5°44′29″W	Category B	11446	Upload another image See more images
Gigha And Cara Parish Church, Cnocan A Chiuil, Ardmenish				55°40′37″N 5°44′34″W	Category B	13759	Upload Photo
Gate-Lodge (With Gate-Piers And Garden Walls) Achamore Estate, Main Road				55°39′40″N 5°45′02″W	Category B	11425	Upload Photo
Cara House				55°38′06″N 5°44′57″W	Category C(S)	11429	Upload another image
Kilchattan Chapel (St Catan's) Kilchattan Burial Ground				55°40′08″N 5°44′58″W	Category B	11447	Upload Photo
Gate-Way, Achamore Estate, Main Road				55°39′59″N 5°44′43″W	Category B	11450	Upload Photo
Gigha And Cara Manse, Ardmenish				55°40′38″N 5°44′21″W	Category B	11427	Upload Photo
Old Water-Mill, Port An Duin				55°41′31″N 5°45′15″W	Category C(S)	11428	Upload Photo

== Key ==
The scheme for classifying buildings in Scotland is:

- Category A: "buildings of national or international importance, either architectural or historic; or fine, little-altered examples of some particular period, style or building type."
- Category B: "buildings of regional or more than local importance; or major examples of some particular period, style or building type, which may have been altered."
- Category C: "buildings of local importance; lesser examples of any period, style, or building type, as originally constructed or moderately altered; and simple traditional buildings which group well with other listed buildings."

In March 2016 there were 47,288 listed buildings in Scotland. Of these, 8% were Category A, and 50% were Category B, with the remaining 42% being Category C.

== See also ==
- List of listed buildings in Argyll and Bute
