= List of listed buildings in Tobermory, Mull =

This is a list of listed buildings in the parish of Tobermory in Argyll and Bute, Scotland.

== List ==
Name	Location	Date listed	Geo-coordinates	Notes	Category	LB number	Image
Mishnish Hotel Main Street			56°37′23″N 6°03′56″W		C(S)	42075	Upload another image
Black's Land, 26, 25, 24, Main Street			56°37′23″N 6°04′04″W		C(S)	42067	Upload another image
Tobermory Pier, Edward VIII Post Box With Sign			56°37′23″N 6°03′53″W		B	44586	Upload another image
Erray Farm And Farmhouse			56°37′51″N 6°04′18″W		B	42073	Upload Photo
Old Pier Main Street			56°37′21″N 6°04′03″W		B	42064	Upload another image
Court House			56°37′15″N 6°04′21″W		B	42072	Upload Photo
Tobermory Parish Church, Victoria Street			56°37′24″N 6°04′13″W		C(S)	42059	Upload another image
'Mansefield', Breadalbane Street			56°37′26″N 6°04′15″W		B	42060	Upload Photo
'Springbank'			56°37′24″N 6°04′10″W		B	42061	Upload Photo
The Gallery (Formerly Free Church), Main Street, Tobermory			56°37′22″N 6°04′08″W		B	42070	Upload another image
35, 34-33 Main Street			56°37′22″N 6°04′07″W		C(S)	42063	Upload Photo
Portmore Buildings, Main Street			56°37′23″N 6°03′57″W		C(S)	42074	Upload Photo
Royal Buildings, Main Street			56°37′23″N 6°03′55″W		C(S)	42076	Upload another image
Post Office, 36 Main Street			56°37′22″N 6°04′08″W		C(S)	42062	Upload another image
Rockcliffe, Main Street			56°37′24″N 6°03′54″W		C(S)	42077	Upload Photo
Brown's Land, 23, 22, 21, Main Street			56°37′23″N 6°04′03″W		C(S)	42068	Upload another image
Rockburn, Main Street (House In Close Behind 28 Main Street)			56°37′24″N 6°04′07″W		C(S)	42069	Upload Photo
28 Main Street			56°37′23″N 6°04′05″W		C(S)	42065	Upload Photo
27 Main Street			56°37′23″N 6°04′04″W		C(S)	42066	Upload Photo
Old Bonded Warehouse Of Tobermory, Distillery Ledaig			56°37′15″N 6°04′15″W		B	42071	Upload another image

== Key ==
The scheme for classifying buildings in Scotland is:

- Category A: "buildings of national or international importance, either architectural or historic; or fine, little-altered examples of some particular period, style or building type."
- Category B: "buildings of regional or more than local importance; or major examples of some particular period, style or building type, which may have been altered."
- Category C: "buildings of local importance; lesser examples of any period, style, or building type, as originally constructed or moderately altered; and simple traditional buildings which group well with other listed buildings."

In March 2016 there were 47,288 listed buildings in Scotland. Of these, 8% were Category A, and 50% were Category B, with the remaining 42% being Category C.

== See also ==
- List of listed buildings in Argyll and Bute
