= Creag-an-Arnain Viaduct =

19th century bridge in Argyll and Bute, Scotland

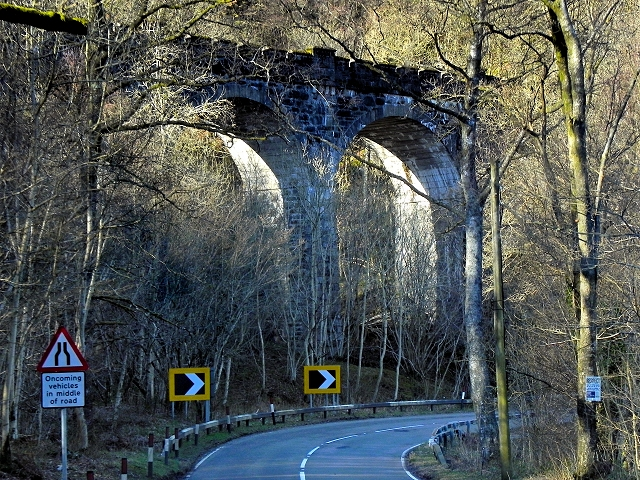
- Coordinates: 56.25815°N 4.70961°W
- OS grid reference: NN 32257 10601
- Carries: West Highland Line
- Locale: Argyll and Bute

Characteristics
- Design: Arch
- Material: Whinstone
- Total length: 104 metres (341 ft)
- Longest span: 11 metres (36 ft)
- No. of spans: 8

History
- Opened: 1894

Listed Building – Category B
- Official name: Creag-an-arnain Railway Viaduct
- Designated: 7 July 1988
- Reference no.: LB864

Location
- Interactive map of Creag-an-Arnain Viaduct

The Creag-an-Arnain Viaduct is a railway viaduct that carries the West Highland Line.

== History ==
The viaduct opened to traffic in 1894 as part of the West Highland Line between Glasgow and Fort William. It may have been designed by James Miller.

== Design ==
The viaduct has eight arches of 11 metres (36 ft) span, for a total length of 104 metres (341 ft). It has a slight curve, and crosses two unnamed burns on the western shore of Loch Lomond.

It is the only conventional masonry viaduct on the West Highland line, many others being made of concrete. It was built of stone arches instead of lattice girders, as many railway bridges were at the time, to avoid contemporary criticism.

== See also ==
- List of bridges in Scotland
