= List of Category A listed buildings in Argyll and Bute =

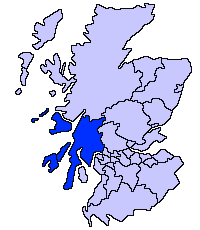
Argyll and Bute shown within Scotland

This is a list of Category A listed buildings in Argyll and Bute, Scotland.

In Scotland, the term listed building refers to a building or other structure officially designated as being of "special architectural or historic interest". Category A structures are those considered to be "buildings of national or international importance, either architectural or historic, or fine little-altered examples of some particular period, style or building type." Listing was begun by a provision in the Town and Country Planning (Scotland) Act 1947, and the current legislative basis for listing is the Planning (Listed Buildings and Conservation Areas) (Scotland) Act 1997. The authority for listing rests with Historic Environment Scotland, an executive agency of the Scottish Government, which inherited this role from the Scottish Development Department in 1991. Once listed, severe restrictions are imposed on the modifications allowed to a building's structure or its fittings. Listed building consent must be obtained from local authorities prior to any alteration to such a structure. There are approximately 47,400 listed buildings in Scotland, of which around 8% (some 3,800) are Category A. The council area of Argyll and Bute covers 6,909 square kilometres (2,668 sq mi), and has a population of around 90,500. There are 2,031 listed buildings in the area, of which approximately 150 are Category A.

== Listed buildings ==
Name	Location	Date listed	Geo-coordinates	Notes	LB number	Image
St Conan's Church	Lochawe village		56°23′43″N 5°03′15″W	19th-century church with early-20th-century additions	4700	Upload another image See more images
Old Breachacha Castle	Coll		56°35′27″N 6°37′41″W	Mid-15th-century castle, restored from a ruin in the 1960s	4708	Upload another image See more images
Breachacha Castle	Coll		56°35′30″N 6°37′47″W	Mid-18th-century manor house	4709	Upload another image See more images
Lochnell Castle	Ardmucknish Bay, Benderloch		56°29′43″N 5°26′10″W	Georgian country house, rebuilt in the late 19th century	4716	Upload another image See more images
Lochnell Observatory (Lady Margaret's Tower)	Lochnell Estate, Benderloch		56°29′22″N 5°26′29″W	19th-century folly	4717	Upload another image See more images
Barcaldine Castle	Benderloch		56°30′38″N 5°24′06″W	Late-16th-century tower house, restored in the late 19th century	4719	Upload another image See more images
Barbreck House	Ardfern		56°12′02″N 5°29′54″W	Georgian country house of 1790	4996	Upload another image See more images
St Munn's Parish Church	Kilmun		55°59′47″N 4°56′33″W	19th-century church on an earlier site, contains Campbell of Argyll and Douglas of Glenfinart mausolea, and a good collection of post-medieval headstones	5073	Upload another image See more images
Dunselma	Strone		55°59′07″N 4°53′59″W	Late-19th-century Scots Baronial country house	5075	Upload another image See more images
Oronsay Priory	Oronsay, Inner Hebrides		56°01′12″N 6°15′17″W	14th-century Augustinian monastery, now in ruins	5086	Upload another image See more images
Oronsay Great Cross	Oronsay		56°01′12″N 6°15′16″W	Carved stone cross dating to 1510	5087	Upload another image See more images
Golden Gates, Benmore Botanic Garden	Strath Eachaig, north of the Holy Loch		56°01′19″N 4°59′23″W	19th-century gates, "an example of exceptional wrought iron work"	6438	Upload another image
St Peter's College	Cardross		55°58′13″N 4°38′26″W	1960s Roman Catholic seminary by Gillespie, Kidd and Coia, now in ruins	6464	Upload another image See more images
Old Kilmun House	Kilmun		55°59′51″N 4°56′37″W	Early-18th-century house with later additions	6582	Upload Photo
Auchindrain Township	Auchindrain		56°10′49″N 5°10′26″W	Preserved settlement of 18th- and 19th-century vernacular buildings, operated as a museum	6798	Upload another image See more images
Carnasserie Castle	Kilmartin		56°09′04″N 5°28′50″W	Later 16th-century tower house with Renaissance detailing	11454	Upload another image See more images
Maam Steading	Glen Shira, Inveraray Castle Estate		56°16′12″N 5°02′03″W	Semi-circular Gothic revival steading, 1790, by Robert Mylne	11518	Upload Photo
Cherrypark	Inveraray Castle		56°14′14″N 5°04′42″W	Castle offices, stables and coachmans house, circa 1760 by John Adam	11528	Upload Photo
Doocot	Carloonan, Inveraray Castle Estate		56°14′58″N 5°05′15″W	18th-century dovecote by Roger Morris	11540	Upload another image See more images
Watch Tower	Dùn Na Cuaiche, Inveraray Castle Estate		56°14′44″N 5°04′03″W	18th-century Gothic revival folly, overlooking the castle	11543	Upload another image See more images
Garden Bridge	Inveraray Castle gardens		56°14′23″N 5°04′30″W	Bridge over the River Aray, circa 1761 by John Adam	11544	Upload another image See more images
Aray Bridge	Mouth of the River Aray, Inveraray Castle Estate	1971	56°14′09″N 5°04′13″W	Bridge carrying the A83 road over the River Aray, designed by Robert Mylne in 1775	11545	Upload another image See more images
Garron Lodge	By Garron Bridge, Glen Shira, Inveraray Castle Estate		56°14′46″N 5°02′47″W	Lodge designed by Robert Mylne in 1775	11548	Upload Photo
Garron Screen Wall	By Garron Bridge, Glen Shira, Inveraray Castle Estate		56°14′46″N 5°02′46″W	Screen wall between bridge and lodge, designed by Robert Mylne in 1775	11549	Upload Photo
Garron Bridge	Glen Shira, Inveraray Castle Estate		56°14′45″N 5°02′44″W	18th-century hump-back bridge carrying the A83 road over the River Shira, designed by Roger Morris	11550	Upload another image See more images
Dubh Loch Bridge	Glen Shira, Inveraray Castle Estate		56°14′59″N 5°02′45″W	18th-century bridge over the River Shira by Robert Mylne	11551	Upload Photo
Inveraray Castle	Inveraray		56°14′15″N 5°04′25″W	18th-century Gothic revival country house, designed by Roger Morris and built by William Adam	11552	Upload another image See more images
Dunderave Castle	North shore of Loch Fyne		56°14′35″N 4°59′53″W	Late-16th-century tower house, restored by Sir Robert Lorimer 1911–1912	11769	Upload another image See more images
Dunans Bridge	Dunans Castle, Glendaruel		56°04′26″N 5°09′00″W	19th-century bridge giving access to Dunans Castle	11806	Upload another image See more images
Sundial at Ormidale House	Mouth of Glendaruel		55°59′12″N 5°12′16″W	18th-century sundial	11810	Upload another image See more images
Carrick Castle	West shore of Loch Goil		56°06′32″N 4°54′20″W	Late-14th-century tower with later additions	11815	Upload another image See more images
Kilmorich Kirk	Cairndow		56°15′15″N 4°56′19″W	Early-19th-century Gothic revival church	11818	Upload another image See more images
Clachan Bridge	Sound of Seil		56°19′04″N 5°34′58″W	18th-century bridge linking Seil to the mainland	11834	Upload another image See more images
Rhinns Of Islay Lighthouse	Orsay, off the Rinns of Islay		55°40′23″N 6°30′48″W	Early-19th-century lighthouse by Robert Stevenson	11944	Upload another image See more images
Dunstaffnage Castle	Mouth of Loch Etive, west of Connel	Not listed	55°35′28″N 3°46′28″W	13th-century curtain-wall castle	11987	Upload another image See more images
Dunstaffnage Chapel	Adjacent to Dunstaffnage Castle		55°35′26″N 3°46′39″W	13th-century chapel, now ruined	11988	Upload another image See more images
Killean Chapel	Killean, Kintyre		55°38′24″N 5°39′50″W	Medieval chapel and burial ground, now in ruins	12004	Upload Photo
Killean House	Killean, Kintyre		55°38′14″N 5°39′41″W	Late-19th-century country house	12005	Upload another image
Killean And Kilchenzie Kirk	A'Chleit, Kintyre		55°36′52″N 5°41′01″W	18th-century church	12035	Upload another image See more images
Mount Stuart House	Isle of Bute		56°38′16″N 6°43′04″W	Gothic country house by Robert Rowand Anderson, 1878	12052	Upload another image See more images
Mount Stuart, Mausoleum And Graveyard	Isle of Bute		56°38′50″N 6°42′59″W	18th-century former church	12055	Upload Photo
Mount Stuart, Kerrylamont Farm Dairy	Isle of Bute		56°37′43″N 6°42′48″W	Late-19th-century circular-plan dairy	12056	Upload another image
Islay House	Islay		55°47′05″N 6°15′15″W	17th-century country house with later extensions	12142	Upload another image See more images
Islay Woollen Mill	Redhouses, Islay		55°47′22″N 6°13′30″W	Mill of 1883, with unusually complete interior and machinery	12143	Upload another image See more images
Lorne Furnace	Bonawe		56°26′13″N 5°13′47″W	18th-century iron furnace	12180	Upload another image See more images
Kilarrow Parish Church	Main Street, Bowmore, Islay		55°45′18″N 6°17′11″W	Circular Georgian church of 1769	12184	Upload another image See more images
Glenorchy Kirk (Clachan an Diseart)	Glenorchy		56°24′15″N 4°58′16″W	Early-19th-century Gothic church	12192	Upload another image See more images
Kilchurn Castle	On a promontory of Loch Awe	Not listed	56°24′14″N 5°01′39″W	15th-century keep with 17th-century ranges	12194	Upload another image See more images
Iona Abbey	Iona		56°20′06″N 6°23′29″W	Complex of buildings dating from the 12th century to c. 1500	12310	Upload another image See more images
Iona Nunnery	Iona	Not listed	56°19′52″N 6°23′39″W	12th-century church and convent	12317	Upload another image See more images
Dhu Heartach Lighthouse	Dubh Artach, 15.5 miles (24.9 km) off Iona		56°07′59″N 6°37′58″W	Granite lighthouse by David Stevenson, completed 1872	12320	Upload another image See more images
Castle Stalker	On an islet in Loch Laich, part of Loch Linnhe		56°34′18″N 5°23′10″W	16th-century tower house	12345	Upload another image See more images
Lismore Lighthouse	Eilean Musdile, Lismore		56°27′20″N 5°36′27″W	1833 lighthouse by Robert Stevenson	12360	Upload another image See more images
Airds House	Port Appin		56°33′01″N 5°24′10″W	18th-century country house	12363	Upload another image
Islandadd Bridge	Bellanoch		56°04′29″N 5°31′44″W	Cast-iron road bridge of 1851	13042	Upload another image See more images
Ardkinglas House	Loch Fyne		56°15′03″N 4°56′50″W	1908 country house by Robert Lorimer	13786	Upload another image
Rossdhu House	Loch Lomond		56°04′13″N 4°38′00″W	18th-century country house and walled garden	14469	Upload another image See more images
Hynish Harbour and Lighthouse Establishment	Hynish, Tiree		56°26′53″N 6°53′39″W	Mid-19th-century group, including signal tower, housing, stores, and enclosures	17848	Upload another image
Skerryvore Lighthouse	Skerryvore, 11 miles (18 km) off Tiree		56°19′23″N 7°06′58″W	1844 lighthouse by Alan Stevenson	17849	Upload another image See more images
3 Kilmoluaig	Kilmoluaig, Tiree		56°30′20″N 6°55′45″W	19th-century thatched cottage	17857	Upload Photo
13 Kilmoluaig	Kilmoluaig, Tiree		56°30′32″N 6°55′31″W	19th-century thatched cottage	17859	Upload Photo
Torosay Castle, statues In Statue Walk	Mull		56°27′16″N 5°41′15″W	18th-century sculptures by Antonio Bonazza	17929	Upload another image See more images
Macquarrie Mausoleum	Gruline, Mull		56°29′12″N 5°58′56″W	Gothic mausoleum, 1824, to Lachlan Macquarie, Governor of New South Wales	17942	Upload another image See more images
Duart Castle	Mull		56°27′22″N 5°39′18″W	14th-century tower with 17th-century house	17974	Upload another image See more images
Torosay Castle	Mull		56°27′18″N 5°41′14″W	1856 mansion by David Bryce	17975	Upload another image See more images
Wester Kames Tower	Isle of Bute		55°52′00″N 5°05′57″W	Tower house rebuilt by Robert Weir Schultz 1897–1900	18287	Upload another image See more images
Stewart Hall	Isle of Bute		55°49′08″N 5°06′21″W	18th-century Palladian house	18289	Upload Photo
Cour House	Saddell		55°40′40″N 5°27′48″W	Country house of 1922 by Oliver Hill	18360	Upload Photo
Castle Sween	Knapdale		55°56′52″N 5°39′56″W	Courtyard castle of c. 1200, the oldest stone castle surviving in Scotland	18389	Upload another image See more images
Saddell Castle	Saddell		55°31′39″N 5°30′17″W	Early-16th-century tower with later additions	18403	Upload another image See more images
Ardencaple Hotel	Rhu Road Lower, Rhu		56°00′48″N 4°45′52″W	Early-19th-century posting inn	19525	Upload another image See more images
Rossdhu South Lodge and Gate	Rossdhu, Loch Lomond		56°02′46″N 4°38′45″W	19th-century estate gateway	19698	Upload another image
Mull of Kintyre Lighthouse	Mull of Kintyre		55°18′38″N 5°48′12″W	18th-century lighthouse, one of first four lighthouses built for the Commissioners of Northern Lighthouses	19874	Upload another image See more images
Bellgrove	High Askomil, Campbeltown		55°25′45″N 5°35′23″W	Early-19th-century house of Palladian form	22940	Upload Photo
Rothmar	High Askomil, Campbeltown		55°25′44″N 5°35′35″W	Late-19th-century house by John James Burnet	22941	Upload Photo
Campbeltown Library and Museum	Hall Street, Campbeltown		55°25′26″N 5°36′11″W	Late-19th-century Renaissance-style building by John James Burnet	22964	Upload another image
St. John's Church of Scotland	Argyll Street, Dunoon		55°57′02″N 4°55′45″W	19th-century Gothic revival church	26440	Upload another image See more images
Rockland	Clyde Street East, Helensburgh		55°59′54″N 4°43′05″W	Greek revival villa by Alexander Thomson, 1854	34737	Upload Photo
The Hill House	Colquhoun Street Upper, Helensburgh		56°01′01″N 4°43′41″W	1902 house by Charles Rennie Mackintosh, owned by the National Trust for Scotland	34761	Upload another image See more images
The White House	Colquhoun Street Upper, Helensburgh		56°00′54″N 4°43′50″W	1899 Arts and Crafts house by Baillie Scott	34762	Upload another image
Drumadoon (formerly Morar Lodge)	Colquhoun Street Upper, Helensburgh		56°01′03″N 4°43′46″W	1903 house by William Leiper, now a private nursing home	34763	Upload another image See more images
Greycourt	Dhuhill Drive West, Helensburgh		56°00′59″N 4°43′51″W	1911 Arts and Crafts villa by A N Paterson	34771	Upload Photo
Red Towers	Douglas Drive, Helensburgh		56°00′53″N 4°43′45″W	Renaissance-style house of 1898 by William Leiper	34774	Upload another image See more images
Brantwoode	Munro Drive West, Helensburgh		56°00′47″N 4°43′47″W	1895 Arts and Crafts house by William Leiper	34822	Upload another image
Cairndhu House	Rhu Road Lower, Helensburgh		56°00′23″N 4°45′12″W	1871 villa by William Leiper with Anglo-Japanese interior	34847	Upload another image
Dalmore House	Rhu Road Lower, Helensburgh		56°00′41″N 4°45′34″W	Baronial mansion of 1873 by William Leiper	34849	Upload another image
Longcroft	Rossdhu Drive West, Helensburgh		56°00′47″N 4°44′10″W	1902 Renaissance-style house by A N Paterson	34851	Upload Photo
Former Helensburgh and Gareloch Conservative Club	38-40 Sinclair Street, Helensburgh		56°00′13″N 4°43′59″W	Glasgow Style building by Honeyman and Keppie	34868	Upload another image See more images
War Memorial	Hermitage Park, Helensburgh		56°00′30″N 4°43′42″W	1923 monument by A N Paterson, in walled garden	34872	Upload another image See more images
St Michael and All Angels' Episcopal Church	William Street, Helensburgh		56°00′18″N 4°44′25″W	1868 church and later church hall by Robert Rowand Anderson	34896	Upload another image See more images
Inveraray Parish Church	Church Square, Inveraray		56°13′49″N 5°04′24″W	1805 church by Robert Mylne, housed separate Gaelic and English-speaking congregations	34978	Upload another image See more images
Morrison's Land	North Main Street West, Inveraray		56°13′50″N 5°04′24″W	Georgian houses of 1767	34981	Upload another image
George Hotel	North Main Street East, Inveraray		56°13′49″N 5°04′22″W	Georgian hotel of 1779	34995	Upload another image See more images
Relief Land	South Main Street East, Inveraray		56°13′47″N 5°04′25″W	Georgian housing of 1779	34999	Upload another image
Mackenzie's Land	South Main Street West, Inveraray		56°13′46″N 5°04′28″W	Georgian housing of 1775	35000	Upload Photo
Black's Land	South Main Street West, Inveraray		56°13′46″N 5°04′27″W	18th-century housing	35001	Upload Photo
Arkland	South Main Street West, Inveraray		56°13′47″N 5°04′26″W	Georgian housing of 1775 by Robert Mylne	35002	Upload another image
Post Office, grocers shop and house	Front Street East, Inveraray		56°13′52″N 5°04′19″W	Georgian housing and shop, 1776	35003	Upload another image
Gillie's House (Buntain's)	Front Street East, Inveraray		56°13′52″N 5°04′19″W	Georgian housing and former bank, 1760	35004	Upload another image
Former Temperance Hotel	Front Street East, Inveraray		56°13′52″N 5°04′20″W	Later 18th-century house	35005	Upload another image
Chamberlain's House	Front Street West, Inveraray		56°13′53″N 5°04′21″W	Georgian house of 1751 by John Adam	35006	Upload another image
Town House	Front Street West, Inveraray		56°13′53″N 5°04′22″W	Customs house, court house and prison by John Adam, 1755	35007	Upload another image
Ivy House	Front Street West, Inveraray		56°13′53″N 5°04′23″W	Georgian house of c. 1755 by John Adam	35008	Upload another image
The Avenue Screen Wall	Front Street West, Inveraray		56°13′54″N 5°04′24″W	Arched wall of 1788 by Robert Mylne	35009	Upload another image
The Great Inn (Argyll Arms Hotel)	Front Street West, Inveraray		56°13′54″N 5°04′27″W	Georgian inn of 1757	35011	Upload another image See more images
Dalmally Road Screen Wall	Front Street West, Inveraray		56°13′54″N 5°04′27″W	Arched wall of 1790 by Robert Mylne	35013	Upload another image
The Duke's Tower (Belfry), beside All Saints Church.	Inveraray		56°13′49″N 5°04′31″W	Gothic revival bell tower, completed 1932	35019	Upload another image See more images
Inveraray Court House	Crown Point, Inveraray		56°13′48″N 5°04′20″W	Georgian court house and prison by James Gillespie Graham, 1819, now a museum	35030	Upload another image See more images
Prison Wall	Crown Point, Inveraray		56°13′47″N 5°04′19″W	Substantial wall around former court house, also by James Gillespie Graham	35032	Upload another image
Factory Land	Inveraray		56°13′48″N 5°04′19″W	Late-18th-century housing	35037	Upload Photo
Ferry Land	Inveraray		56°13′49″N 5°04′19″W	Late-18th-century housing	35038	Upload Photo
Fern Point (Ardrainic)	Inveraray		56°13′50″N 5°04′19″W	Georgian house of 1753, the earliest house in the new town of Inveraray	35039	Upload Photo
St. Columba's Cathedral	Corran Esplanade, Oban		56°25′10″N 5°28′44″W	Modern Gothic church by Sir Giles Gilbert Scott, completed 1952	38820	Upload another image See more images
Bute Mausoleum	High Kirk of Rothesay, Rothesay, Bute		55°49′43″N 5°03′28″W	Late-18th-century mausoleum of eclectic design	40446	Upload another image
St Andrew's Roman Catholic Church	Columshill Street, Rothesay, Bute		55°50′10″N 5°03′30″W	Byzantine-style church of 1923 by Reginald Fairlie	40451	Upload Photo
Rothesay Pavilion	Argyle Street, Rothesay, Bute		55°50′26″N 5°03′43″W	International Style entertainment pavilion of 1938, by James Carrick	40452	Upload another image See more images
The Winter Gardens	Victoria Street, Rothesay, Bute		55°50′18″N 5°03′20″W	Domed winter garden and bandstand of 1923, with Art Nouveau detailing	40454	Upload another image
Bute Estate Office	55 High Street, Rothesay, Bute		55°50′10″N 5°03′14″W	17th-century building, originally the Marquess of Bute's town house	40456	Upload another image See more images
Tor House	Ardencraig Road, Rothesay, Bute		55°50′28″N 5°01′37″W	Greek-revival villa by Alexander Thomson, c. 1855	40468	Upload Photo
Gareloch House	Clynder, Gareloch		56°00′51″N 4°48′31″W	Early-19th-century classical villa with particularly fine landscaped garden	42621	Upload Photo
Bathwell	Rosneath Castle Estate, Rosneath		55°59′56″N 4°47′07″W	Mid-later 18th-century bath house	42625	Upload Photo
Rosneath Home Farm	Rosneath Castle Estate, Rosneath		55°59′39″N 4°46′56″W	Large Gothic steading by Alexander Nasmyth, 1803	42628	Upload another image
Ferry Inn	Rosneath Point, Rosneath		56°00′43″N 4°47′46″W	1897 Arts and Crafts villa by Edwin Lutyens	42630	Upload Photo
St Modan's Parish Church	Rosneath		56°00′34″N 4°48′05″W	1854 English Gothic church by David Cousin	42634	Upload another image See more images
Saint Mahew's Chapel	Darleith Road, Cardross		55°58′19″N 4°39′30″W	15th-century chapel, restored in the 1950s as a Catholic church	42905	Upload another image See more images
Redholme	Kilkerran Road, Campbeltown		55°25′10″N 5°35′52″W	Arts and Crafts villa of 1896 by Henry E Clifford	43088	Upload Photo
Sloy Power Station	Loch Sloy		56°15′40″N 4°45′52″W	Designed in a classical style by Tarbolton & Ochterlony, with buttress-type dam by James Williamson, opened 1950	43188	Upload another image See more images
The Dolls' Houses	Killean House Estate, Kintyre		55°38′26″N 5°39′47″W	Pair of arts and crafts cottages by John James Burnet	43266	Upload another image
Glen Eden	Shore Road, Kilcreggan		55°59′21″N 4°50′59″W	1850s villa by Alexander Thomson	43442	Upload Photo
Knockderry Castle	Shore Road, Cove		56°00′37″N 4°51′43″W	1850s house by Alexander Thomson, with Baronial additions by William Leiper, 1897	43452	Upload another image See more images
Craig Ailey	South Ailey Road, Cove		55°59′32″N 4°51′07″W	1850 villa by Alexander Thomson	43472	Upload another image See more images
Auchendennan House	Arden		56°00′59″N 4°37′09″W	Baronial chateau by John Burnet, 1866	43871	Upload another image
Darleith Dovecot	Darleith House, Colgrain		55°59′23″N 4°39′09″W	Late-18th-century 4-stage dovecot	43874	Upload another image
Rothesay Castle	Rothesay, Bute	Not listed	55°50′11″N 5°03′18″W	13th-century castle, rebuilt c. 1500 and restored c. 1900 by the Marquess of Bute	44887	Upload another image See more images
Balmory House	Balmory Road, Ascog, Bute		55°49′17″N 5°01′42″W	1861 Italianate villa with Adam Style interiors	44984	Upload Photo
Former Charcoal Store	Ironworks, Furnace, Argyll and Bute		56°09′09″N 5°10′47″W	Mid 18th-century rubble-built industrial building, later used as a drill hall	49844	Upload Photo
Falls of Cruachan Railway Viaduct	Ardchattan And Muckairn	1 February 2007	56°23′40″N 5°06′51″W	3-arch, part-concrete railway viaduct designed by John Strain, 1880	50811	Upload another image See more images
Ben Cruachan Hydro Electric Scheme, Turbine Hall	Ben Cruachan, Argyll and Bute	11 February 2011	56°24′23″N 5°06′47″W	J B Armstrong, 1959-65	51688	Upload Photo

== See also ==
- Scheduled monuments in Argyll and Bute
