= List of listed buildings in Cove And Kilcreggan =

This is a list of listed buildings in the parish of Cove and Kilcreggan in Argyll and Bute, Scotland.

== List ==
Name	Location	Date Listed	Grid Ref. (Note: Sometimes known as OSGB36, the grid reference (where provided) is based on the British national grid reference system used by the Ordnance Survey. • "Guide to National Grid". Ordnance Survey. • "Get-a-map". Ordnance Survey.)	Geo-coordinates	Notes	LB Number (Note: Historic Environment Scotland assign a unique alphanumeric identifier to each designated site in Scotland, for listed buildings this always begins with "LB", for example "LB12345".)	Image
Argyll Road, Kilcreggan House With Service Block, Garden Buildings, Boundary Walls, Railings And Gatepiers				55°59′13″N 4°49′15″W	Category B	43389	Upload Photo
School Road, Cove And Kilcreggan Community Centre (Former School) With Boundary Wall, Gatepiers And Railings				55°59′15″N 4°50′32″W	Category C(S)	43400	Upload Photo
Shore Road, Ardgour With Boundary Walls				55°59′03″N 4°50′09″W	Category C(S)	43405	Upload Photo
Shore Road, Ashlea And Ellerslie With Gates, Gatepiers And Boundary Walls				55°59′52″N 4°51′08″W	Category B	43409	Upload Photo
Shore Road, Auchendarroch With Boundary Wall, Gates And Gatepiers				55°59′03″N 4°49′44″W	Category B	43410	Upload another image
Shore Road, Balgair With Boundary Wall And Gatepiers				55°59′09″N 4°50′27″W	Category C(S)	43413	Upload Photo
Shore Road, Benvarran House With Boundary Walls				55°59′03″N 4°49′48″W	Category C(S)	43416	Upload Photo
Shore Road, Casa Blanca With Boundary Wall And Road Sign				56°00′08″N 4°51′06″W	Category B	43424	Upload Photo
Shore Road, Craigrownie Church Hall With Boundary Walls And Gatepiers				55°59′16″N 4°50′50″W	Category B	43432	Upload Photo
Shore Road, Dunvorleigh With Boundary Walls				55°59′03″N 4°49′34″W	Category B	43436	Upload Photo
Shore Road, Grafton With Conservatory, Gatepiers And Boundary Wall				56°00′07″N 4°51′05″W	Category B	43447	Upload Photo
Shore Road, Kirklea With Boundary Walls And Gatepiers				55°59′19″N 4°50′59″W	Category B	43451	Upload Photo
Shore Road, Knockderry House Hotel With Boundary Walls And Gatepiers				56°00′39″N 4°51′43″W	Category B	43454	Upload Photo
Shore Road, Lethington With Boundary Walls And Gatepiers				55°59′12″N 4°50′37″W	Category B	43456	Upload Photo
Shore Road, Park Place With Boundary Wall, Gates And Gatepiers				56°00′12″N 4°51′09″W	Category C(S)	43461	Upload Photo
Shore Road, Seymour Lodge With Gig-House, Boundary Wall And Gatepiers				55°59′54″N 4°51′05″W	Category B	43465	Upload Photo
Shore Road, Strathlee With Outbuilding, Boundary Wall And Gatepiers				56°00′14″N 4°51′10″W	Category B	43467	Upload Photo
South Ailey Road, Baron Cliff Lodge With Pedestrian Gates, Gatepiers And Boundary Wall				55°59′33″N 4°51′06″W	Category C(S)	43471	Upload Photo
Aidenkyle Road, Aidenkyle House With Balustrade, Greenhouses, Boundary Wall And Gatepiers				55°59′06″N 4°50′15″W	Category B	42866	Upload Photo
Church Road, Craigrownie Parish Church				55°59′22″N 4°50′54″W	Category B	43392	Upload another image See more images
Cove Village, Shore Road, K6 Telephone Kiosk				55°59′38″N 4°51′15″W	Category B	43393	Upload Photo
Kilcreggan Village, Shore Road, Argyll Buildings				55°59′06″N 4°49′16″W	Category C(S)	43396	Upload Photo
Shore Road, Glen Eden With Coach House, Gatepiers, Boundary Wall And Mile Sign				55°59′21″N 4°51′01″W	Category A	43442	Upload Photo
Shore Road, Knockderry Cottage				56°00′39″N 4°51′41″W	Category C(S)	43453	Upload Photo
Shore Road, Lancross (Formerly Belmont) With Boundary Wall And Gatepiers				55°59′04″N 4°50′14″W	Category C(S)	43455	Upload Photo
Shore Road, Lovedale With Greenhouse, Boundary Wall And Gatepiers				55°59′06″N 4°50′19″W	Category C(S)	43458	Upload Photo
Shore Road, Winton With Boundary Wall And Gatepiers				55°59′11″N 4°50′36″W	Category B	43468	Upload Photo
Shore Road, Woodside				56°00′16″N 4°51′12″W	Category B	43470	Upload Photo
South Ailey Road, Hartfield Castle Gates, Gatepiers And Boundary Walls Along South Ailey Road And Rosneath Road				55°59′26″N 4°51′04″W	Category B	43474	Upload Photo
Argyll Road, Benvue With Boundary Wall				55°59′07″N 4°49′35″W	Category C(S)	43388	Upload Photo
Knockderry Road, Lucerne				56°00′18″N 4°51′07″W	Category B	43398	Upload Photo
Shanton Road, Former Stable Block To Myrtle Park				56°00′03″N 4°51′02″W	Category C(S)	43402	Upload Photo
Shore Road, Auchengower Lodge With Gatepiers, Railings And Boundary Wall				56°00′49″N 4°52′00″W	Category B	43412	Upload Photo
Shore Road, Birken Hillock With Gatepiers And Boundary Wall				56°00′32″N 4°51′35″W	Category C(S)	43417	Upload Photo
Shore Road, Burncliff Cottage With Bothy				56°00′06″N 4°51′05″W	Category B	43423	Upload Photo
Shore Road, Cove War Memorial				55°59′15″N 4°50′54″W	Category C(S)	43430	Upload another image See more images
Shore Road, Drumdarragh (Former Manse To Church Of Scotland) With Boundary Walls And Gatepiers				55°59′16″N 4°50′49″W	Category C(S)	43435	Upload Photo
Shore Road, Eastwood With Boundary Wall And Gatepiers				55°59′15″N 4°49′24″W	Category C(S)	43438	Upload Photo
Shore Road, Mount Pleasant				55°59′07″N 4°50′19″W	Category C(S)	43459	Upload Photo
Shore Road, South Park With Outbuilding				56°00′20″N 4°51′16″W	Category C(S)	43466	Upload Photo
Shore Road, Woodleigh				56°00′30″N 4°51′32″W	Category C(S)	43469	Upload Photo
Argyll Road, Kilcreggan Hotel				55°59′09″N 4°49′29″W	Category B	43390	Upload Photo
Kilcreggan Village, Shore Road, K6 Telephone Kiosk				55°59′06″N 4°49′12″W	Category B	43397	Upload Photo
Shore Road, Aidenburn Cottage With Gates And Boundary Wall				55°59′05″N 4°49′22″W	Category C(S)	43403	Upload Photo
Shore Road, Ardery Cottage With Gatepiers And Boundary Wall				55°59′03″N 4°50′08″W	Category C(S)	43404	Upload Photo
Shore Road, Broomcraig With Gatepiers And Boundary Wall				56°00′25″N 4°51′25″W	Category C(S)	43421	Upload Photo
Shore Road, Broompark With Boundary Walls And Gatepiers				55°59′18″N 4°50′56″W	Category C(S)	43422	Upload Photo
Shore Road, Cove Castle, With Boundary Walls And Gatepiers				55°59′50″N 4°51′07″W	Category B	43429	Upload another image See more images
Shore Road, Craigrownie Cottage With Boundary Wall And Gatepiers				55°59′32″N 4°51′11″W	Category B	43433	Upload Photo
Shore Road, Greenhill With Balustrade, Boundary Wall, Gates And Gatepiers				55°59′12″N 4°50′38″W	Category C(S)	43448	Upload Photo
Shore Road, The Linn				56°00′14″N 4°51′02″W	Category B	43457	Upload Photo
South Ailey Road, Craigrownie Castle (Former Stewart Home) With Boundary Wall, Gatepiers And Pedestrian Gates				55°59′29″N 4°51′06″W	Category B	43473	Upload another image See more images
Donaldson's Brae, Feorlin With Boundary Wall And Gates				55°59′06″N 4°49′31″W	Category C(S)	43394	Upload Photo
Peaton Road, Peaton House, Gatepiers And Boundary Walls				56°02′04″N 4°51′49″W	Category B	43399	Upload Photo
Shore Road, Armadale With Garden House, Boundary Wall And Gatepiers				56°00′21″N 4°51′19″W	Category C(S)	43407	Upload Photo
Shore Road, Auchengower With Balustraded Wall				56°00′57″N 4°51′55″W	Category B	43411	Upload Photo
Shore Road, Brenneil With Boundary Wall And Gatepiers				55°59′10″N 4°50′33″W	Category C(S)	43419	Upload Photo
Shore Road, Glendhualt With Service Block, Gatepiers And Boundary Wall				56°00′20″N 4°51′11″W	Category B	43441	Upload Photo
Shore Road, Glenholly With Boundary Wall And Gatepiers				56°00′22″N 4°51′22″W	Category B	43443	Upload Photo
Shore Road, Glenlea With Boundary Walls And Gatepiers				55°59′10″N 4°50′34″W	Category B	43444	Upload Photo
Shore Road, Knockderry Castle With Boundary Walls, Gatepiers And Railings				56°00′37″N 4°51′43″W	Category A	43452	Upload another image
Shore Road, Rockingham With Balustrade, Boundary Wall And Gatepiers				55°59′15″N 4°50′47″W	Category B	43462	Upload Photo
School Road, School House (Former Schoolmaster's House)				55°59′18″N 4°50′32″W	Category C(S)	43401	Upload Photo
Shore Road, Ashcraig With Boundary Wall, Gates And Gatepiers				55°59′46″N 4°51′10″W	Category C(S)	43408	Upload Photo
Shore Road, Craigoulet East And West With Boundary Walls And Gatepiers				55°59′35″N 4°51′13″W	Category B	43431	Upload Photo
Shore Road, Dowall Burn Bridge				56°00′15″N 4°51′14″W	Category B	43434	Upload Photo
Shore Road, Kenilworth Surgery With Gatepiers And Boundary Wall				55°59′13″N 4°50′43″W	Category C(S)	43449	Upload Photo
Argyll Road, Woodburn With Boundary Wall, Gates And Gatepiers				55°59′08″N 4°49′20″W	Category B	43391	Upload Photo
Shore Road, Ardsloy With Boundary Walls				55°59′03″N 4°49′46″W	Category B	43406	Upload another image
Shore Road, Baron Cliff Gatepier, Pedestrian Gate And Boundary Wall				55°59′33″N 4°51′13″W	Category C(S)	43415	Upload Photo
Shore Road, Bloomfield With Boundary Wall And Gatepiers				55°59′40″N 4°51′12″W	Category B	43418	Upload Photo
Shore Road, Claremont With Gatepiers And Boundary Walls				55°59′06″N 4°50′21″W	Category C(S)	43426	Upload Photo
Shore Road, Clevedon Hotel And Belvedere				55°59′48″N 4°51′07″W	Category B	43427	Upload Photo
Shore Road, Evendene With Gatepiers And Boundary Wall				56°00′32″N 4°51′36″W	Category C(S)	43439	Upload Photo
Shore Road, Ferndean With Gatepier And Boundary Wall				55°59′57″N 4°51′04″W	Category B	43440	Upload Photo
Shore Road, Glentrae With Boundary Walls And Gatepiers				55°59′11″N 4°50′35″W	Category B	43446	Upload Photo
Shore Road, The Kinder Garten (Formerly Finnartmore)				55°59′13″N 4°50′41″W	Category B	43450	Upload Photo
South Ailey Road, Craig Ailey With Boundary Wall, Gates And Gatepiers				55°59′32″N 4°51′07″W	Category A	43472	Upload another image See more images
Kilcreggan Pier And Former Pier Office				55°59′03″N 4°49′12″W	Category B	43395	Upload Photo
Shore Road, Barbour Cemetery With Gates, Gatepiers And Monuments				56°02′16″N 4°52′00″W	Category B	43414	Upload Photo
Shore Road, Brookvale With Boundary Walls				56°00′14″N 4°51′11″W	Category B	43420	Upload Photo
Shore Road, Claremont (Near Clevedon Hotel)				55°59′47″N 4°51′07″W	Category B	43425	Upload Photo
Shore Road, Cove Burgh Hall And Reading Room				55°59′17″N 4°50′53″W	Category B	43428	Upload another image
Shore Road, Dunvronaig With Boundary Walls				55°59′04″N 4°49′31″W	Category B	43437	Upload Photo
Shore Road, Glen Rowan With Boundary Wall				56°00′23″N 4°51′23″W	Category B	43445	Upload Photo
Shore Road, Myrtle Park With Conservatory, Gatepiers And Boundary Wall				56°00′03″N 4°51′04″W	Category C(S)	43460	Upload Photo
Shore Road, Roscombe (Formerly Patlaw) With Boundary Wall				55°59′04″N 4°49′30″W	Category C(S)	43463	Upload Photo
Shore Road, Seaview With Boundary Walls And Gatepiers				55°59′03″N 4°49′49″W	Category C(S)	43464	Upload Photo

== Key ==
The scheme for classifying buildings in Scotland is:

- Category A: "buildings of national or international importance, either architectural or historic; or fine, little-altered examples of some particular period, style or building type."
- Category B: "buildings of regional or more than local importance; or major examples of some particular period, style or building type, which may have been altered."
- Category C: "buildings of local importance; lesser examples of any period, style, or building type, as originally constructed or moderately altered; and simple traditional buildings which group well with other listed buildings."

In March 2016 there were 47,288 listed buildings in Scotland. Of these, 8% were Category A, and 50% were Category B, with the remaining 42% being Category C.

== See also ==
- List of listed buildings in Argyll and Bute
