= Cove Burgh Hall =

Municipal building in Cove, Scotland

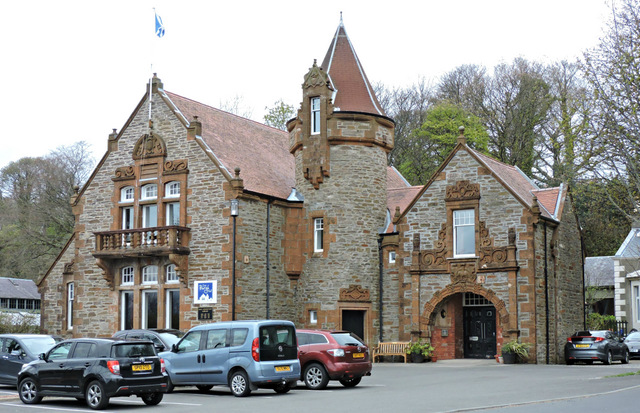
- Cove Burgh Hall

- Shown in Argyll and Bute
- 55.9880°N 4.8481°W
- Location: Shore Road, Cove

History
- Built: 1893

Site notes
- Architect: James Chalmers
- Architectural style: Scottish Renaissance style

Listed Building – Category B
- Official name: Shore Road, Cove Burgh Hall and Reading Room
- Designated: 8 September 1980
- Reference no.: LB43428

Cove Burgh Hall is a municipal structure in Shore Road in Cove, Argyll and Bute, Scotland. The structure, which is used as a community events venue, is a Category B listed building.

== History ==
In 1889, three letters were sent to the Helensburgh News complaining about the lack of a burgh hall in Cove. In response, the founder of Clan Line, Sir Charles Cayzer, 1st Baronet, who, in 1890, had bought Clevedon House in Cove for use as his summer house, agreed to become provost of the burgh of Cove and Kilcreggan in 1891 and, in that capacity, to launch an initiative to erect a bespoke building for the burgh. The building was financed by public subscription with most of the funding coming from the wealthy inhabitants of the burgh including Cayzer, who personally contributed £500. The site chosen on Shore Road was made available at a subsidised feu by the landowner, George Campbell, 8th Duke of Argyll, whose seat was at Inveraray Castle.

The building was designed by James Chalmers of Glasgow in the Scottish Renaissance style, built in rubble masonry with red sandstone dressings at a cost of £2,300 and was officially opened by the then-provost, Peter Donaldson, on 10 May 1893. The design involved an asymmetrical main frontage with four bays facing onto Shore Road. The first bay on the left was formed by a single-storey gabled block; the second bay, which projected forward, was formed by a two-storey gabled block with three segmental windows on the ground floor flanked by brackets supporting a balustraded balcony, and a tri-partite mullioned and transomed window surmounted by an open pediment on the second floor; the third bay was formed by a three-stage circular tower, which featured a tall dormer window in the third stage and was surmounted by a conical roof; the fourth bay was formed by a two-storey gabled block with a wide arched entrance, which was encircled by ornate voussoirs and surmounted by a carved coat of arms, on the ground floor, with a sash window surrounded by an architrave on the first floor. Internally, the principal rooms were the main assembly hall, which could accommodate about 130 people, and the library.

The building continued to serve as the meeting place of the burgh council for much of the 20th century but ceased to be the local seat of government when the enlarged Argyll District Council was formed in 1975. Following the creation of unitary authorities in 1996, Argyll and Bute Council inherited the building and announced, in February 1999, that it would close the building because of the high cost of maintenance. In response, a former director of Clugston Group, Peter Holland, led an initiative to acquire the building for a nominal sum and to refurbish it. An extensive programme of works, which included new windows, a new heating system and roof repairs, was completed in autumn 2001.

The building was subsequently used as a community events venue with regular meetings being held by organisations such as the Cove and Kilcreggan Film Society and the Cove and Kilcreggan Literary Society. Speakers at the annual Cove and Kilcreggan Book Festival have included the crime writer, Sir Ian Rankin, the journalist Jon Snow, the broadcaster, Sally Magnusson, the journalist, Melanie Reid, and the crime writer, Val McDermid.

== See also ==
- List of listed buildings in Cove And Kilcreggan
