= Inveraray Jail =

Council headquarters in Inveraray, Scotland

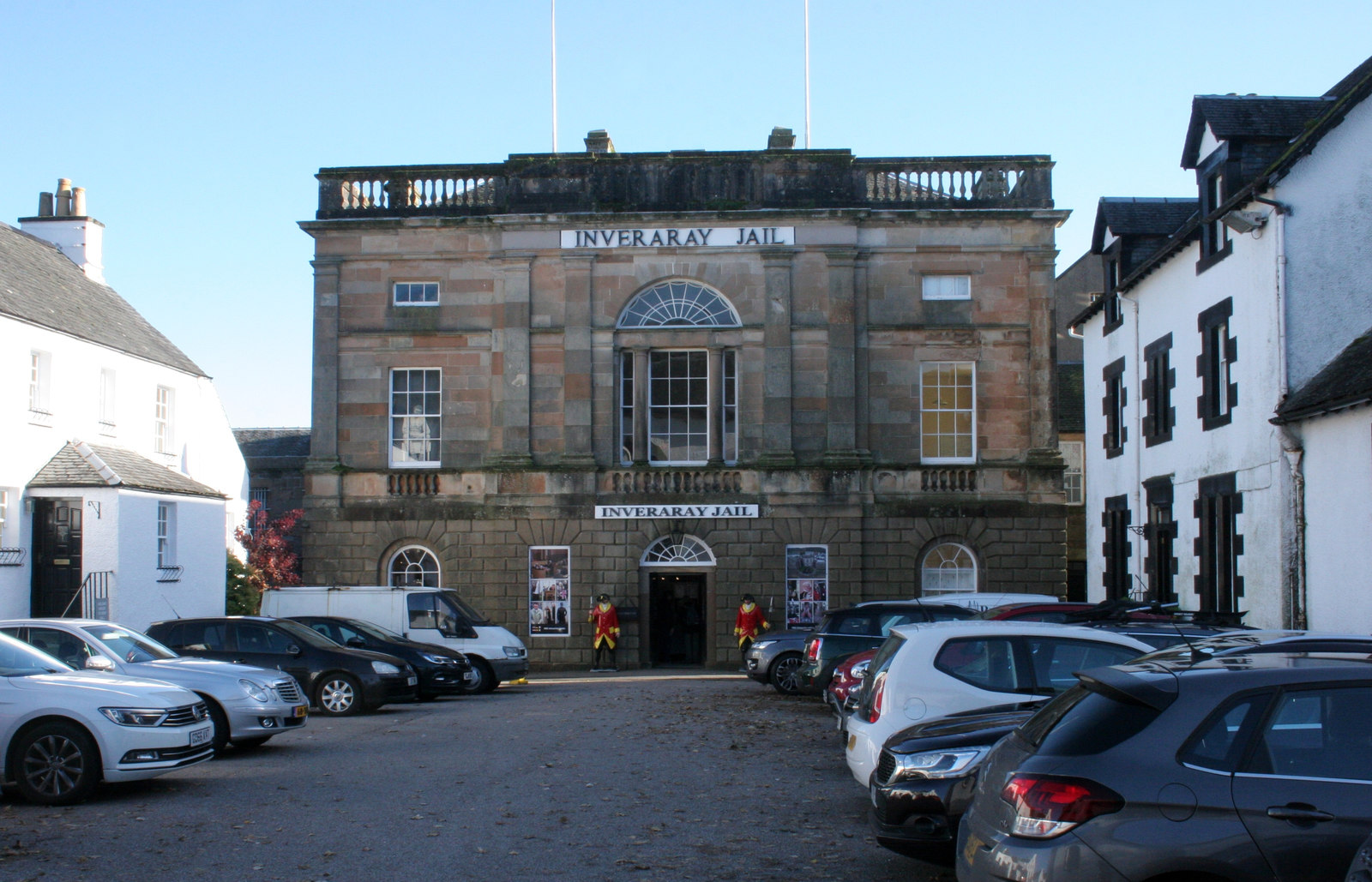
- Inveraray Jail

- Shown in Argyll and Bute
- 56.2299°N 5.0723°W
- Location: Church Square, Inveraray

History
- Built: 1820

Site notes
- Architect(s): James Gillespie Graham and Robert Reid
- Architectural style: Neoclassical style

Listed Building – Category A
- Official name: Former Inveraray Court House, Crown Point, Inveraray
- Designated: 28 February 1966
- Reference no.: LB35030

Listed Building – Category B
- Official name: Old Jail, Crown Point, Inveraray
- Designated: 4 August 1966
- Reference no.: LB35034

Listed Building – Category C(S)
- Official name: New Jail, Crown Point, Inveraray
- Designated: 4 August 1966
- Reference no.: LB35033

Inveraray Jail is a former prison and courthouse in Church Square, Inveraray, Argyll and Bute, Scotland. It was built in 1820 and is a Category A listed building. The prison closed in 1889 but the building remained in use as a courthouse until the mid-twentieth century, in which time it was also used for some meetings of Argyll County Council. Since 1989 it has been a museum.

== History ==
Inveraray Gaol and Courthouse Act 1814
- Act of Parliament
- Parliament of the United Kingdom
- Long title: An Act for erecting a new Gaol and Court House in the Burgh of Inveraray, in the Shire of Argyll.
- Citation: 54 Geo. 3. c. cii

Dates
- Royal assent: 17 June 1814

Text of statute as originally enacted

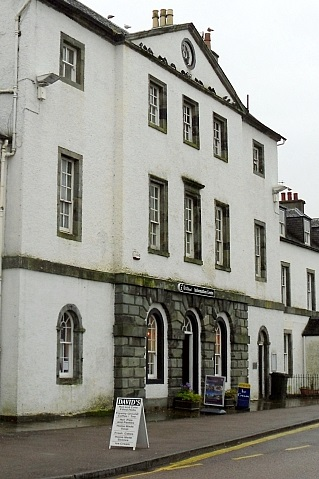
The old court house on Front Street

The building was commissioned by the Inveraray Gaol and Courthouse Act 1814 (54 Geo. 3. c. cii) to replace the old town house on Front Street which dated from 1755 and which had been deemed too small. The original plans for the new building had called for a courthouse and three prisons, one for males, one for females and one for debtors, but the scheme was deemed too expensive and was curtailed.

The new courthouse was designed by James Gillespie Graham based on initial drawings by Robert Reid in the neoclassical style, built in ashlar stone and was completed in 1820. The design of the courthouse involved a symmetrical main frontage of three bays facing onto Church Square. The central bay featured a doorway with a fanlight on the ground floor and a Venetian window on the first floor. The outer bays were fenestrated with round headed windows on the ground floor, sash windows on the first floor and small oblong windows at attic level. All the windows on the first floor had balustrades in front of them and were flanked by paired Tuscan order pilasters supporting an entablature, a cornice and a balustraded parapet. The building was bowed at the back. Internally, the principal room was the main courtroom at the rear of the building on the first floor with views across Loch Fyne.

A two-storey prison block, the "old prison block", which was also designed by Graham, was built in coursed rubble to the northeast of the courthouse and was completed at the same time as the courthouse. Following the implementation of the Prisons (Scotland) Act 1839, which brought about various changes including the separation of prisoners, a three-storey prison, the "new prison block", which was designed by Thomas Brown, was built in coursed rubble to the southwest of the courthouse and completed in 1845.

The Prisons (Scotland) Act 1877 brought in further changes, including the transfer of the management of prisons from local authorities to the UK Government and the closure of smaller prisons in favour of larger ones. After the prisoners had been transferred to Barlinnie Prison in Glasgow, Inveraray Prison closed in 1889.

The courthouse was also used for meetings of the Argyll Commissioners of Supply, which was the main administrative body for the county prior 1890. Elected county councils were established in 1890 under the Local Government (Scotland) Act 1889, and the new council needed to identify a meeting place. The County Council's first meeting was held at the courthouse at Inveraray on 22 May 1890, when over three hours were spent debating where the council should meet thereafter, with proposals put forward in favour of meeting in Lochgilphead, Inveraray, Oban, Dunoon, or even Glasgow (despite the latter being outside the county). It was decided to meet at Dunoon between May and September and at Oban for the rest of the year. The council did subsequently hold meetings in more places than just those two towns, including occasionally meeting at the courthouse in Inverary, but it established its main offices at Lochgilphead.

By the mid-20th century the courthouse had become dilapidated and, in 1954, an order was made that there should be no more sheriff court hearings at Inveraray. Police and Justice of the Peace Court hearings continued for a while but, in 1962, Argyll County Council sold the courthouse.

The courthouse complex at Inveraray was refurbished to a design by Ian Gordon Lindsay & Partners in 1965 and converted into a visitor attraction as "Inveraray Jail" in May 1989.

== Gallery ==
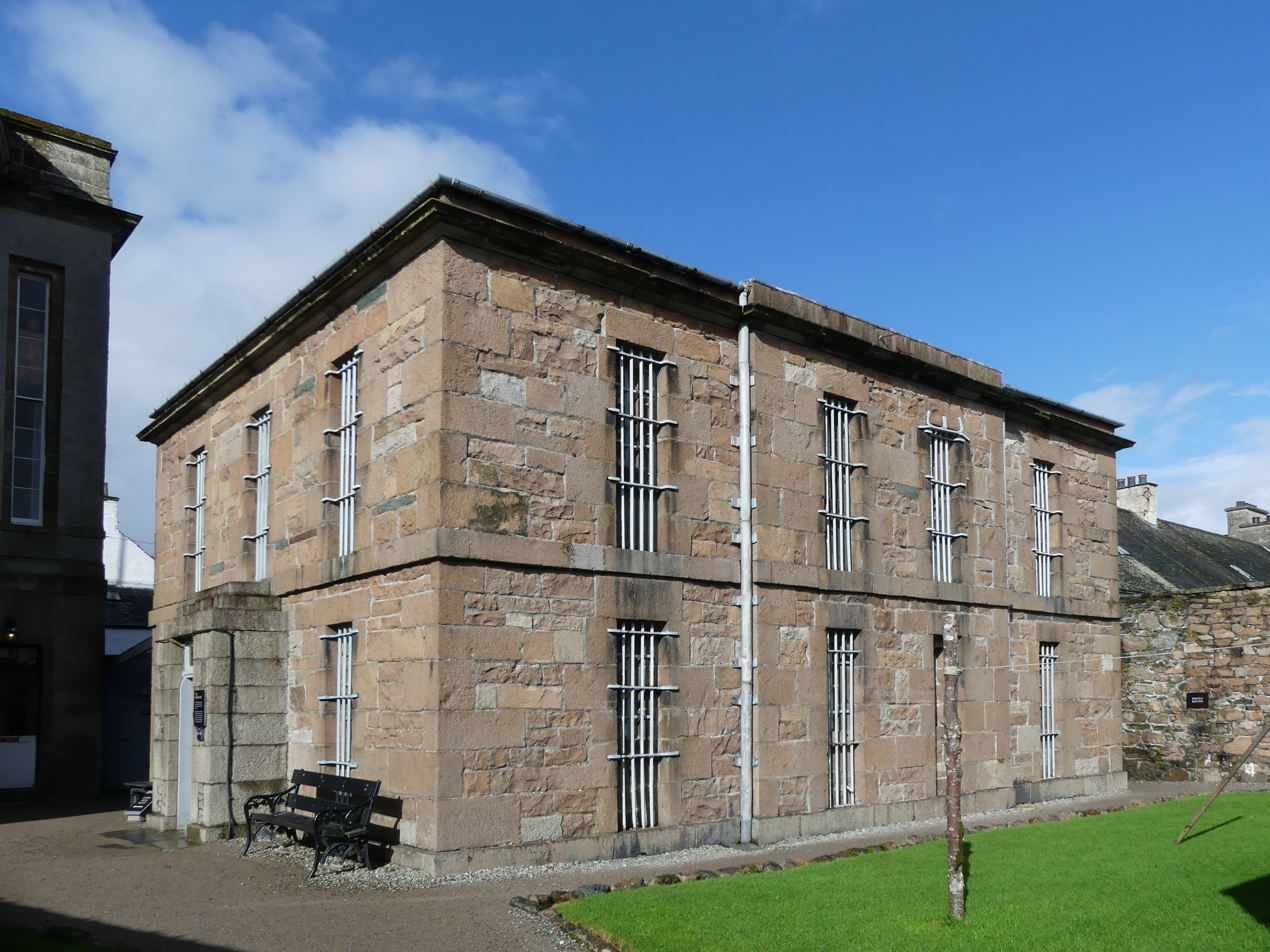
The old two-storey prison block

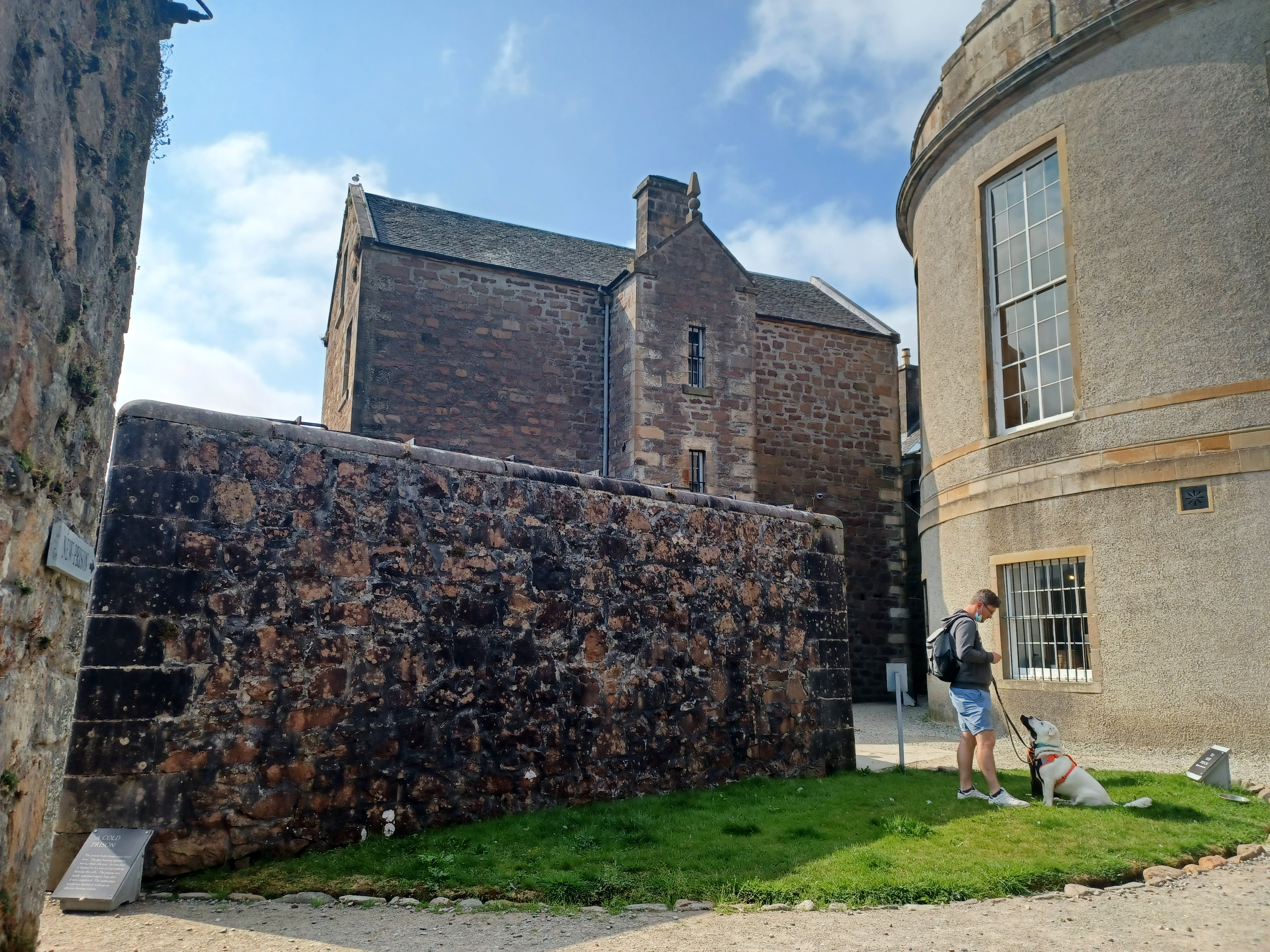
The new three-storey prison block

== See also ==
- List of Category A listed buildings in Argyll and Bute
- List of listed buildings in Inveraray
