= List of listed buildings in Inveraray =

This is a list of listed buildings in the parish of Inveraray in Argyll and Bute, Scotland.

== List ==
| Name | Location | Date Listed | Grid Ref. (Note: Sometimes known as OSGB36, the grid reference (where provided) is based on the British national grid reference system used by the Ordnance Survey. • "Guide to National Grid". Ordnance Survey. • "Get-a-map". Ordnance Survey.) | Geo-coordinates | Notes | LB Number (Note: Historic Environment Scotland assign a unique alphanumeric identifier to each designated site in Scotland, for listed buildings this always begins with "LB", for example "LB12345".) | Image |
|---|---|---|---|---|---|---|---|
| House, Bakers And Butcher's Shop (Nicol's And Fleming's) N. Main St. W | | | | 56°13′51″N 5°04′22″W | Category B | 34984 | Upload Photo |
| Albion Tea Rooms And House N. Main St. W | | | | 56°13′52″N 5°04′22″W | Category B | 34985 | Upload Photo |
| House (Buntain's) N. Main Street E | | | | 56°13′50″N 5°04′22″W | Category B | 34994 | Upload Photo |
| Garden Wall Of George Hotel, Church Square | | | | 56°13′49″N 5°04′22″W | Category B | 34997 | Upload Photo |
| Mackenzie's Land, South Main Street West | | | | 56°13′46″N 5°04′28″W | Category A | 35000 | Upload Photo |
| House (Buntain's) East Front Street | | | | 56°13′52″N 5°04′19″W | Category A | 35004 | Upload Photo |
| Shop And Restaurant (Old Smiddy) W. Front St | | | | 56°13′55″N 5°04′28″W | Category B | 35014 | Upload Photo |
| Out-House, Iii Back Lane | | | | 56°13′46″N 5°04′28″W | Category C(S) | 35024 | Upload Photo |
| Prison Wall, Crown Point | | | | 56°13′47″N 5°04′19″W | Category A | 35032 | Upload another image |
| Ferry Land | | | | 56°13′49″N 5°04′19″W | Category A | 35038 | Upload Photo |
| House (Cameron's) | | | | 56°13′36″N 5°04′37″W | Category C(S) | 35052 | Upload Photo |
| Claonairigh, Old Mill, Including Nearby Structure At The 'Roman Bridge' | | | | 56°11′46″N 5°07′50″W | Category B | 12946 | Upload Photo |
| Cherrypark. (Castle Offices And Stables.) Inveraray Castle Policies | | | | 56°14′15″N 5°04′41″W | Category A | 11528 | Upload Photo |
| No 6 Castle Gardens (Formerly Gardener's Cottage) At Walled Garden | | | | 56°14′33″N 5°04′57″W | Category C(S) | 11531 | Upload Photo |
| Maltland Cottage (Formerly Head Gardener's Cottage.) Malt Land Inveraray Castle Policies | | | | 56°14′36″N 5°05′05″W | Category C(S) | 11532 | Upload Photo |
| Garron Bridge (Drochaid Geart-Abhainn), Mouth Of River Shira Arrochar Rd | | | | 56°14′45″N 5°02′44″W | Category A | 11550 | Upload another image See more images |
| Macintyre's Highland Warehouse. N. Main St. E | | | | 56°13′51″N 5°04′21″W | Category B | 34991 | Upload Photo |
| Stables And Cart-House, Paymaster's Close, Off N. Main St. E | | | | 56°13′51″N 5°04′20″W | Category C(S) | 34992 | Upload Photo |
| Town House, W. Front St | | | | 56°13′53″N 5°04′22″W | Category A | 35007 | Upload another image |
| Stables And Coachhouses, To Rear Of Argyll Arms Hotel | | | | 56°13′53″N 5°04′27″W | Category C(S) | 35012 | Upload Photo |
| House ('Old Bakehouse') W. Front St | | | | 56°13′55″N 5°04′28″W | Category B | 35015 | Upload Photo |
| Macvicar's Land (Arkland Ii) Back Lane | | | | 56°13′47″N 5°04′27″W | Category B | 35022 | Upload Photo |
| Cross Houses, Lochgilphead Road | | | | 56°13′46″N 5°04′29″W | Category B | 35025 | Upload Photo |
| Factory Land | | | | 56°13′48″N 5°04′19″W | Category A | 35037 | Upload Photo |
| Store-House (Old Dower-House) Quay Close | | | | 56°13′52″N 5°04′19″W | Category B | 35043 | Upload Photo |
| Inverary Pier | | | | 56°13′53″N 5°04′14″W | Category B | 35044 | Upload another image See more images |
| Radio And Shop (Grant And Lawson's) North Main Street, West | | | | 56°13′50″N 5°04′24″W | Category B | 34979 | Upload Photo |
| Claonairigh House | | | | 56°11′44″N 5°07′48″W | Category B | 12945 | Upload Photo |
| Boat House, Dubh Loch | | | | 56°15′11″N 5°02′53″W | Category C(S) | 11516 | Upload Photo |
| Blast Furnace, Furnace Village | | | | 56°09′08″N 5°10′49″W | Category B | 11527 | Upload Photo |
| Carloonan Mill, River Aray | | | | 56°15′00″N 5°05′20″W | Category C(S) | 11539 | Upload Photo |
| Beehive Cottage Brackley Wood | | | | 56°14′37″N 5°04′29″W | Category B | 11542 | Upload Photo |
| Kirkapoll Cross, Near Inveraray Castle | | | | 56°14′14″N 5°04′22″W | Category B | 11554 | Upload Photo |
| Bridge Over Leacainn River, To N Of Braleckan (W Of Auchindrain Township) | | | | 56°10′34″N 5°11′31″W | Category C(S) | 47271 | Upload Photo |
| Barn Brae, Barn To Rear Of Cottages At Newton Row | | | | 56°13′33″N 5°04′38″W | Category C(S) | 50993 | Upload Photo |
| House (Roses) And Iron Mongers (Clerks) North Main Street East | | | | 56°13′52″N 5°04′20″W | Category B | 34987 | Upload Photo |
| House And Shoe Shop (Dewar's) N. Main St. E | | | | 56°13′51″N 5°04′21″W | Category B | 34990 | Upload Photo |
| Post Office, Grocers Shop And House East Front Street | | | | 56°13′52″N 5°04′19″W | Category A | 35003 | Upload Photo |
| Castle Lodge, Inveraray Castle Policies | | | | 56°13′56″N 5°04′27″W | Category B | 35017 | Upload Photo |
| Out-House I Back Lane | | | | 56°13′47″N 5°04′27″W | Category C(S) | 35021 | Upload Photo |
| House And Sample's Garage Office. Lochgilphead Rd | | | | 56°13′45″N 5°04′29″W | Category C(S) | 35026 | Upload Photo |
| Crombie's Land | | | | 56°13′47″N 5°04′22″W | Category B | 35027 | Upload Photo |
| Bank Of Scotland, Church Square | | | | 56°13′48″N 5°04′22″W | Category B | 35029 | Upload Photo |
| Cottages, Adjoining Old Free Church School | | | | 56°13′39″N 5°04′36″W | Category C(S) | 35046 | Upload Photo |
| Morrison's Land, N. Main St. W. And Close At Rear | | | | 56°13′50″N 5°04′24″W | Category A | 34981 | Upload Photo |
| Well-House, Bealach An Fhuarain | | | | 56°13′52″N 5°05′06″W | Category B | 11520 | Upload Photo |
| Ice-House Inveraray Castle Policies | | | | 56°14′17″N 5°04′46″W | Category B | 11529 | Upload Photo |
| Bothy (Old Groom's House), Malt Land Inveraray Castle Policies | | | | 56°14′36″N 5°05′04″W | Category C(S) | 11533 | Upload Photo |
| Jubilee Hall Malt Land | | | | 56°14′36″N 5°05′01″W | Category B | 11537 | Upload Photo |
| Dubh Loch Bridge (Drochaid Athnanlann), River Shira | | | | 56°14′59″N 5°02′45″W | Category A | 11551 | Upload Photo |
| Out-House. At Rear Of House (Item 11) | | | | 56°13′51″N 5°04′20″W | Category B | 34989 | Upload Photo |
| House, (Campbell's) And Draper's Shop, N. Main St. E | | | | 56°13′50″N 5°04′22″W | Category B | 34993 | Upload Photo |
| Garden Wall Of Bank Of Scotland, Church Square | | | | 56°13′48″N 5°04′23″W | Category B | 34998 | Upload Photo |
| House (Miss Maclacklands) Formerly Temperance Hotel E. Front St. And N. Main St. W | | | | 56°13′52″N 5°04′20″W | Category A | 35005 | Upload Photo |
| 'Ivy House' W. Front St | | | | 56°13′53″N 5°04′23″W | Category A | 35008 | Upload Photo |
| Dalmally Road Screen Wall, W. Front St | | | | 56°13′54″N 5°04′27″W | Category A | 35013 | Upload Photo |
| House (Ferguson's) (Old Schoolmaster's House.) | | | | 56°13′37″N 5°04′36″W | Category C(S) | 35049 | Upload Photo |
| Cottage (Mcintyre's) | | | | 56°13′35″N 5°04′37″W | Category C(S) | 35054 | Upload Photo |
| House (Old United Presbyterian Manse) | | | | 56°13′34″N 5°04′37″W | Category B | 35055 | Upload Photo |
| Society School, Glen Aray | | | | 56°16′46″N 5°05′26″W | Category B | 11523 | Upload Photo |
| Watch Tower, Dun Na Cuaiche | | | | 56°14′44″N 5°04′03″W | Category A | 11543 | Upload another image See more images |
| Garron Lodge (With Gate-Piers), Arrochar Rd | | | | 56°14′46″N 5°02′47″W | Category A | 11548 | Upload another image See more images |
| Garron Screen Wall, Arrochar Rd | | | | 56°14′46″N 5°02′46″W | Category A | 11549 | Upload Photo |
| Inveraray Castle | | | | 56°14′15″N 5°04′25″W | Category A | 11552 | Upload another image |
| Furnace Village, Former Charcoal Store | | | | 56°09′09″N 5°10′47″W | Category A | 49844 | Upload Photo |
| House, Tweed And Hardware Shops (Macintyres And Clerk's) N. Main St. W | | | | 56°13′52″N 5°04′22″W | Category B | 34986 | Upload Photo |
| House (Clerks) And Ironmongers (Clerks) N. Main St. E | | | | 56°13′52″N 5°04′20″W | Category B | 34988 | Upload Photo |
| Kitchen, At Rear Of George Hotel | | | | 56°13′49″N 5°04′22″W | Category B | 34996 | Upload Photo |
| The Avenue Screen Wall, W. Front St | | | | 56°13′54″N 5°04′24″W | Category A | 35009 | Upload Photo |
| West Front Street And Dalmally Road, Inveraray Inn (The Great Inn) | | | | 56°13′54″N 5°04′27″W | Category A | 35011 | Upload another image See more images |
| Parkwall Inveraray Castle Policies Between Old Bake-House And Castle Lodge W. Front St | | | | 56°13′55″N 5°04′27″W | Category C(S) | 35016 | Upload Photo |
| Out-House Ii Back Lane | | | | 56°13′47″N 5°04′27″W | Category C(S) | 35023 | Upload Photo |
| Old School-House, Off Church Square | | | | 56°13′48″N 5°04′20″W | Category B | 35036 | Upload Photo |
| 'Fern Point' ('Ardrainich') | | | | 56°13′50″N 5°04′19″W | Category A | 35039 | Upload Photo |
| Quay Close, Coffee House | | | | 56°13′51″N 5°04′19″W | Category B | 35042 | Upload Photo |
| Inverary Mercat Cross | | | | 56°13′53″N 5°04′20″W | Category A | 35045 | Upload another image |
| House (Davidson's) (Old Episcopal Rectory) | | | | 56°13′35″N 5°04′37″W | Category B | 35053 | Upload Photo |
| 'Roman Bridge' Claonairi, Douglas Water | | | | 56°11′47″N 5°07′48″W | Category B | 11524 | Upload Photo |
| Saw Mill And House (Old Barracks), Malt Land Inveraray Castle Policies | | | | 56°14′37″N 5°05′08″W | Category B | 11535 | Upload Photo |
| Aray Bridge, Mouth Of River Aray, Arrochar Road | | | | 56°14′09″N 5°04′13″W | Category A | 11545 | Upload another image |
| Auchindrain Township | | | | 56°10′49″N 5°10′26″W | Category A | 6798 | Upload another image |
| Black's Land; S. Main St. W | | | | 56°13′46″N 5°04′27″W | Category A | 35001 | Upload Photo |
| Chamberlain's House, West Front Street And N. Main St. W | | | | 56°13′53″N 5°04′21″W | Category A | 35006 | Upload Photo |
| The Duke's Tower, (Belfry) Beside All Saints Church | | | | 56°13′49″N 5°04′31″W | Category A | 35019 | Upload another image |
| Bank Manager's House, Church Square | | | | 56°13′47″N 5°04′22″W | Category B | 35028 | Upload Photo |
| New Jail, Crown Point | | | | 56°13′47″N 5°04′20″W | Category C(S) | 35033 | Upload another image |
| Old Jail, Crown Point | | | | 56°13′48″N 5°04′19″W | Category B | 35034 | Upload another image |
| House (A. Blyth's) (Joiner's House). Church Square | | | | 56°13′48″N 5°04′21″W | Category B | 35035 | Upload Photo |
| Garden Wall, Fern Point Hotel | | | | 56°13′50″N 5°04′18″W | Category B | 35041 | Upload Photo |
| House (Stewart's) | | | | 56°13′36″N 5°04′37″W | Category C(S) | 35050 | Upload Photo |
| St. Malieu Hall (Formerly Inverary United Presbyterian Church) | | | | 56°13′36″N 5°04′37″W | Category C(S) | 35051 | Upload Photo |
| Houses (Johnson's) | | | | 56°13′34″N 5°04′36″W | Category C(S) | 35056 | Upload Photo |
| Crucchon Cottage (Morrison's) | | | | 56°13′33″N 5°04′37″W | Category C(S) | 35057 | Upload Photo |
| Cottage (Ferguson's) | | | | 56°13′33″N 5°04′37″W | Category C(S) | 35059 | Upload Photo |
| Craigdhu (Formerly Free Church Manse) | | | | 56°13′30″N 5°04′40″W | Category B | 35061 | Upload Photo |
| Glenaray And Inveraray Parish Church And Church Hall, Church Square | | | | 56°13′49″N 5°04′24″W | Category A | 34978 | Upload another image See more images |
| House And Jeweller's Shop N. Main St. W | | | | 56°13′51″N 5°04′23″W | Category B | 34982 | Upload Photo |
| 'The Fishing House', Carloonan | | | | 56°14′59″N 5°05′21″W | Category B | 13769 | Upload Photo |
| Maam Farmhouse Including Outbuilding | | | | 56°16′15″N 5°02′05″W | Category B | 11517 | Upload Photo |
| Inveraray Manse Lochgilphead Road | | | | 56°13′25″N 5°04′44″W | Category B | 11522 | Upload Photo |
| Walled Garden Inveraray Castle Policies | | | | 56°14′33″N 5°05′03″W | Category B | 11530 | Upload Photo |
| Carloon, Doocot | | | | 56°14′58″N 5°05′15″W | Category A | 11540 | Upload another image See more images |
| Garden Bridge, River Aray | | | | 56°14′23″N 5°04′30″W | Category A | 11544 | Upload Photo |
| Salmon Draught Cottage, Arrochar Rd | | | | 56°14′35″N 5°03′29″W | Category C(S) | 11546 | Upload Photo |
| Campbell Monument, Inveraray Castle Policies | | | | 56°14′21″N 5°04′28″W | Category B | 11547 | Upload Photo |
| All Saints Episcopal Church Off The Avenue | | | | 56°13′50″N 5°04′30″W | Category B | 35018 | Upload Photo |
| Restaurant And Bar 'Fern Point' Hotel | | | | 56°13′50″N 5°04′20″W | Category B | 35040 | Upload Photo |
| Masonic Hall (Formerly Inveraray Free Church) | | | | 56°13′37″N 5°04′36″W | Category C(S) | 35048 | Upload Photo |
| North Cromallt Lodge, Lochgilphead Road | | | | 56°13′13″N 5°05′14″W | Category B | 13768 | Upload Photo |
| Maam Steading (Inveraray Great Farm) | | | | 56°16′12″N 5°02′03″W | Category A | 11518 | Upload Photo |
| Kilblaan Bridge, River Shira | | | | 56°16′36″N 5°01′43″W | Category B | 11519 | Upload Photo |
| Evan Maccoll Monument, Kenmore | | | | 56°10′16″N 5°07′03″W | Category C(S) | 11525 | Upload Photo |
| Cottages, Inveraray Castle Policies To West Of Bothy Malt Land | | | | 56°14′36″N 5°05′06″W | Category C(S) | 11534 | Upload Photo |
| George Hotel, N. Main Street E | | | | 56°13′49″N 5°04′22″W | Category A | 34995 | Upload another image |
| Relief Land, 86 Main St. East | | | | 56°13′47″N 5°04′25″W | Category A | 34999 | Upload Photo |
| Arkland, S. Main St. W | | | | 56°13′47″N 5°04′26″W | Category A | 35002 | Upload Photo |
| Cottage (Formerly Porter's Lodge) (New) Part Of The Argyll Arm Hotel W. Front St | | | | 56°13′54″N 5°04′25″W | Category B | 35010 | Upload Photo |
| The Avenue Wall (On E. Side Of The Avenue From West Front Street To Newtown) | | | | 56°13′42″N 5°04′34″W | Category B | 35020 | Upload Photo |
| Inveraray Court House, Crown Point | | | | 56°13′48″N 5°04′20″W | Category A | 35030 | Upload another image |
| Old Police Station, Crown Point | | | | 56°13′47″N 5°04′21″W | Category C(S) | 35031 | Upload Photo |
| Old Free Church School | | | | 56°13′38″N 5°04′36″W | Category C(S) | 35047 | Upload Photo |
| Cottage (Britton's) | | | | 56°13′33″N 5°04′37″W | Category C(S) | 35058 | Upload Photo |
| Workshop (Grant Lawson's) In Yard At Rear Of Shop (Item 2) | | | | 56°13′50″N 5°04′25″W | Category C(S) | 34980 | Upload Photo |
| House And Chemist's Shop (Macpherson Tough's) | | | | 56°13′51″N 5°04′23″W | Category B | 34983 | Upload Photo |
| South Cromallt Lodge, Lochgilphead Road | | | | 56°13′03″N 5°05′29″W | Category B | 11521 | Upload Photo |
| Pennymore House, By Loch Fyne | | | | 56°09′32″N 5°08′39″W | Category B | 11526 | Upload Photo |
| Stables, Malt Land Inveraray Castle Policies | | | | 56°14′37″N 5°05′04″W | Category B | 11536 | Upload Photo |
| Carloonan Bridge, River Aray | | | | 56°15′08″N 5°05′24″W | Category B | 11538 | Upload Photo |
| Lime-Kiln (And Adjacent Buildings) Between Brackley Wood And River Aray | | | | 56°14′38″N 5°04′33″W | Category C(S) | 11541 | Upload Photo |
| Gatepiers, Near Inveraray Castle | | | | 56°14′14″N 5°04′22″W | Category B | 11553 | Upload Photo |

== Key ==
The scheme for classifying buildings in Scotland is:

- Category A: "buildings of national or international importance, either architectural or historic; or fine, little-altered examples of some particular period, style or building type."
- Category B: "buildings of regional or more than local importance; or major examples of some particular period, style or building type, which may have been altered."
- Category C: "buildings of local importance; lesser examples of any period, style, or building type, as originally constructed or moderately altered; and simple traditional buildings which group well with other listed buildings."

In March 2016 there were 47,288 listed buildings in Scotland. Of these, 8% were Category A, and 50% were Category B, with the remaining 42% being Category C.

== See also ==
- List of listed buildings in Argyll and Bute
