= Beinn Bhuidhe (Glen Fyne) =

Scottish mountain at the head of Loch Fyne, Argyll and Bute

Coordinates: 56.32661°N 4.90687°W

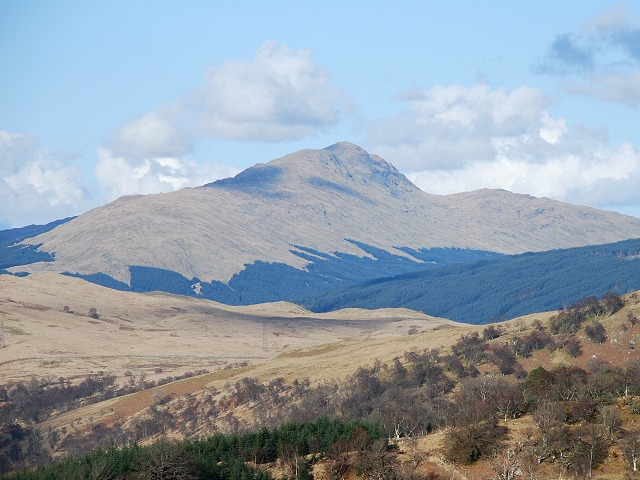

Highest point
- Elevation: 948 m (3,110 ft)
- Prominence: 592 m (1,942 ft)
- Parent peak: Ben Lui
- Listing: Munro

Naming
- English translation: yellow mountain
- Language of name: Gaelic
- Pronunciation: Gaelic [ə ˈveiɲ ˈvujə]

Geography
- Location within Scotland
- Location: Argyll and Bute, Scotland
- Parent range: Grampian Mountains
- OS grid: NN20361871
- Topo map: OS Landranger 50, 56.

Climbing
- Easiest route: Hike

Beinn Bhuidhe is a mountain near the head of Loch Fyne in Argyll in the Scottish Highlands. It is a Munro with a height of 948 metres (3,110 ft).

== Overview ==
Beinn Bhuidhe is a 948-metre (3,110 ft) Munro that lies separately from the main body of the Arrochar Alps. It is remote and unfrequented, situated to the north of the head of Loch Fyne between the upper reaches of Glen Fyne and Glen Shira. It is the only high hill in an extensive tract of featureless moorland between the head of Loch Lomond and Loch Awe. Its long summit ridge has three tops, the summit being the south-western one. Beinn Bhuidhe is much quieter than the Arrochar Alps proper, due in part to the 7.3-kilometre (4 1/2 mi) walk-in along a private road before starting the climb.

== Geography ==
Beinn Bhuidhe is large mountain with three ridges shaped like the prongs of a trident. The longest ridge is the most southerly of the three and extends to Clachan Hill (658 m or 2,159 ft). The shortest is the most northerly and runs to Beinn an t-Sidhein (694 metres (2,277 ft)). Between them lies the main ridge upon which the summit is located, which runs for six kilometres (3 1/2 mi) from Tom a’ Phiobaire in the southwest to Ceann Garbh (803 m or 2,635 ft) in the north-east. The summit (948 m or 3,110 ft) is located approximately midway along this ridge.

== Ascents ==
There are roads in both Glen Fyne and Glen Shira but Beinn Bhuidhe is mostly accessed from the former. There are good tracks giving access to the long south-west ridges, but the short and steep route running west-north-west from Inverchorachan House is the most popular.
