= Glen Shira =

Valley feature in Argyll, Scotland, UK

Glen Shira Gleann Siara (Scottish Gaelic)
- Glen
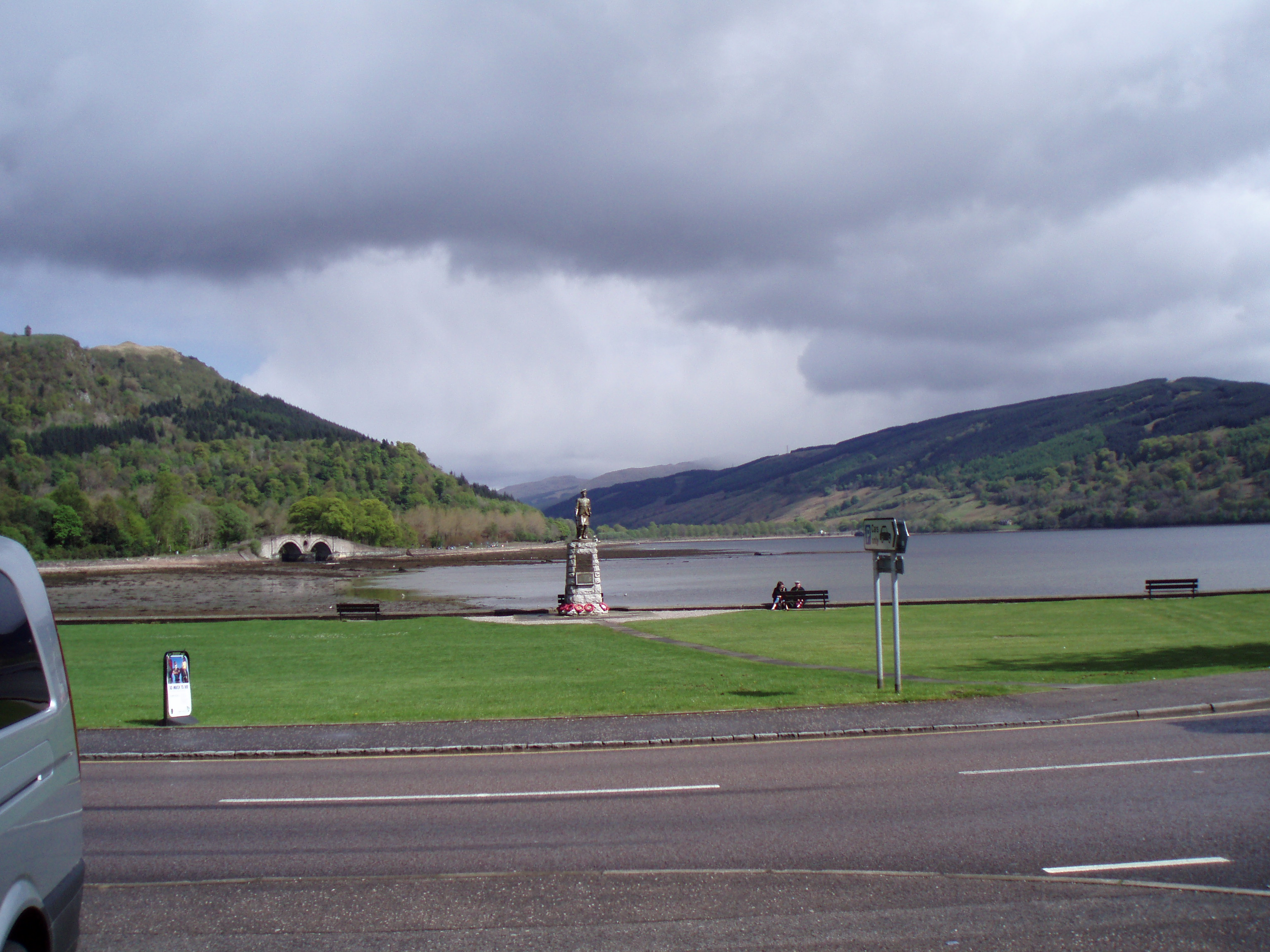
- Inveraray facing north towards the glen mouth.

- Location within Scotland
- Coordinates: 56°17′06″N 05°01′01″W
- Grid position: NN 13349 14374
- Location: Argyll and Bute, Scotland

Glen Shira (Gaelic: Gleann Siara, "Glen of the eternal river") is a glen in Argyll and Bute, west of Scotland, at the northern end of Loch Fyne, just to the north of Inveraray. It is a Special Area of Conservation within the UK, bordered by Beinn Bhuidhe on the Glen Fyne side.

Glen Shira is named after the River Shira, which runs through the centre of the glen. The river starts to the northeast at 350 metres elevation, near the start of the River Fyne. Shira runs into the 5 MW Sròn Mòr (Big Nose) power station dam, and then for about seven miles (eleven kilometres) down to and through Loch Dubh (Black Lake) at the base. From there, the waters flow into Loch Shira, a small inlet on Loch Fyne that, in turn, lends its name to the MV Loch Shira ferry.

The glen is mostly taken up by a resident's sheep farm, but there are numerous houses within the glen, including Elrigbeg (Eileirig Beag), Elrig More (Eileirig Mór), Kilblaan and Drimlee (at the northern end). There is one single-track road which leads up the glen to the dam. This road splits into an access road (connected across the River Shira by a bridge) which leads to Drimlee.

Asda also once produced a whisky called Glen Shira, although this had no connection to the actual glen.

== Rob Roy MacGregor ==
Rob Roy MacGregor lived in Glen Shira for a short time under the protection of John Campbell, 2nd Duke of Argyll, also known as Red John of the Battles (Iain Ruaidh nan Cath). Argyll negotiated an amnesty and protection for Rob in 1716, and granted him permission to build a house in upper Glen Shira after disarmament.

Records suggest that Rob Roy also constructed a fank for sheep or cattle in the Glen. However, some time after the 1719 Jacobite Rebellion — likely around 1720 — Rob moved to Monachyle Tuarach by Loch Doine, abandoning the structures. Nevertheless, ruins remain extant.

== Gallery ==
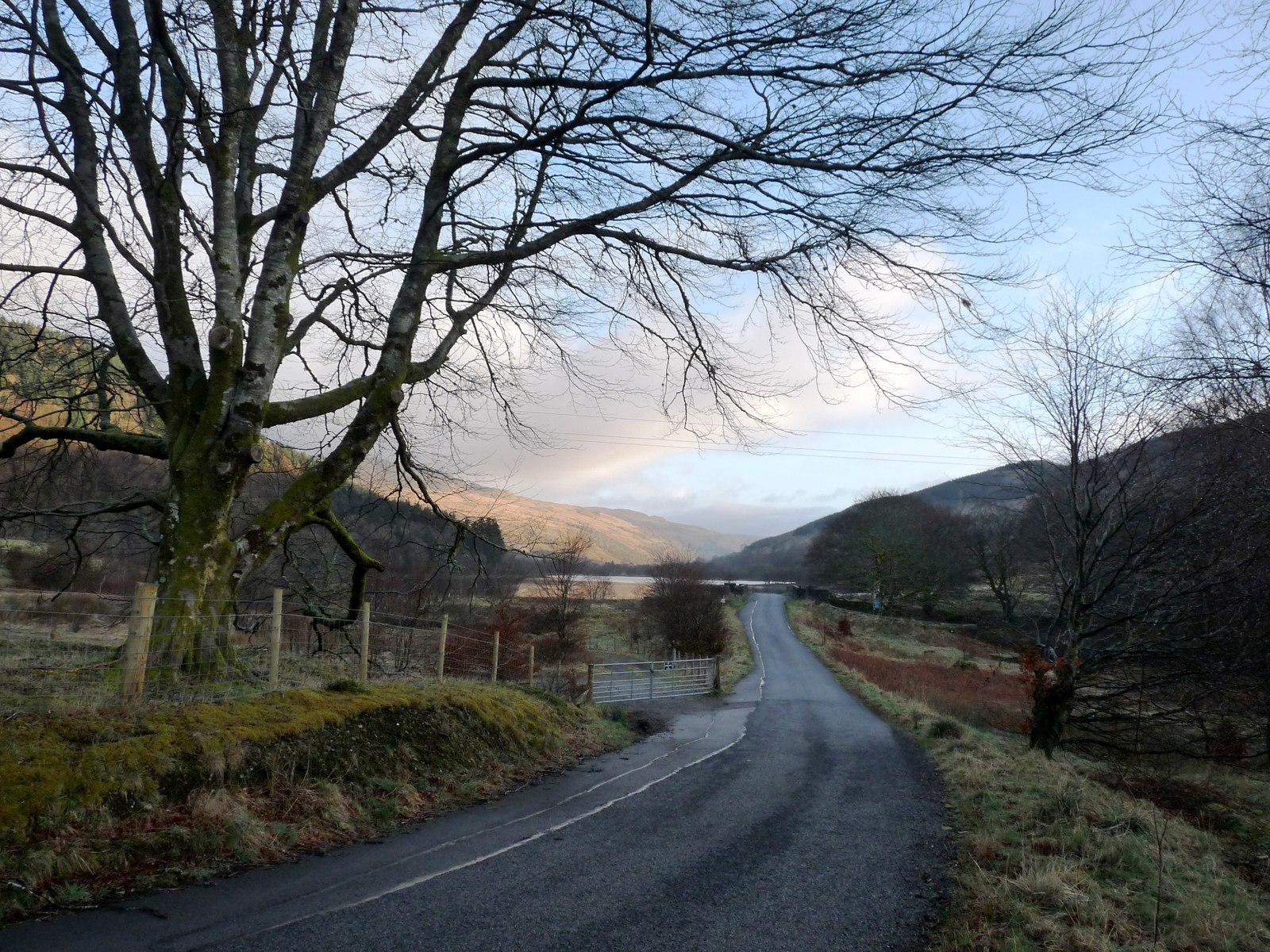
Glen Shira

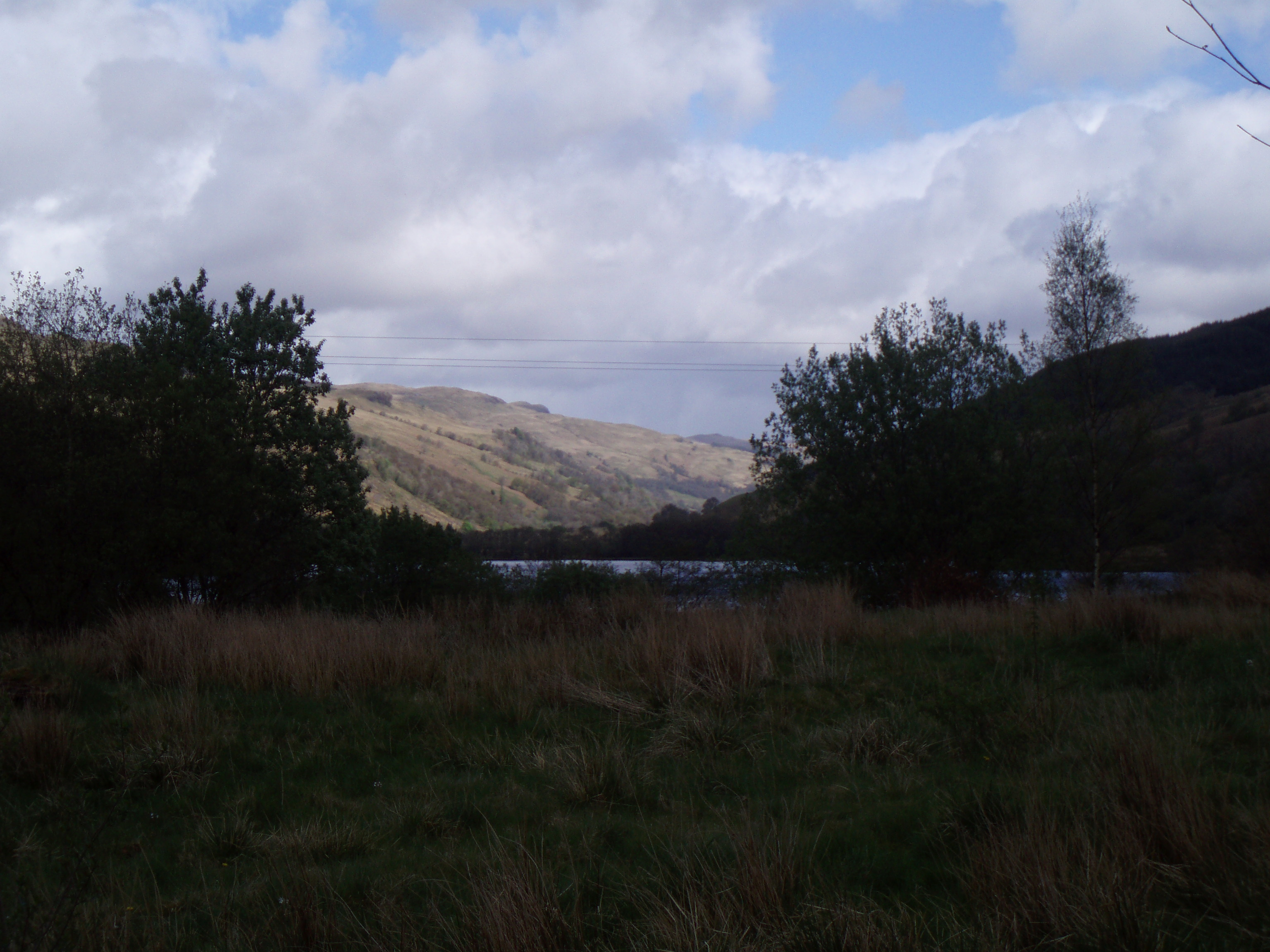
Glen Shira

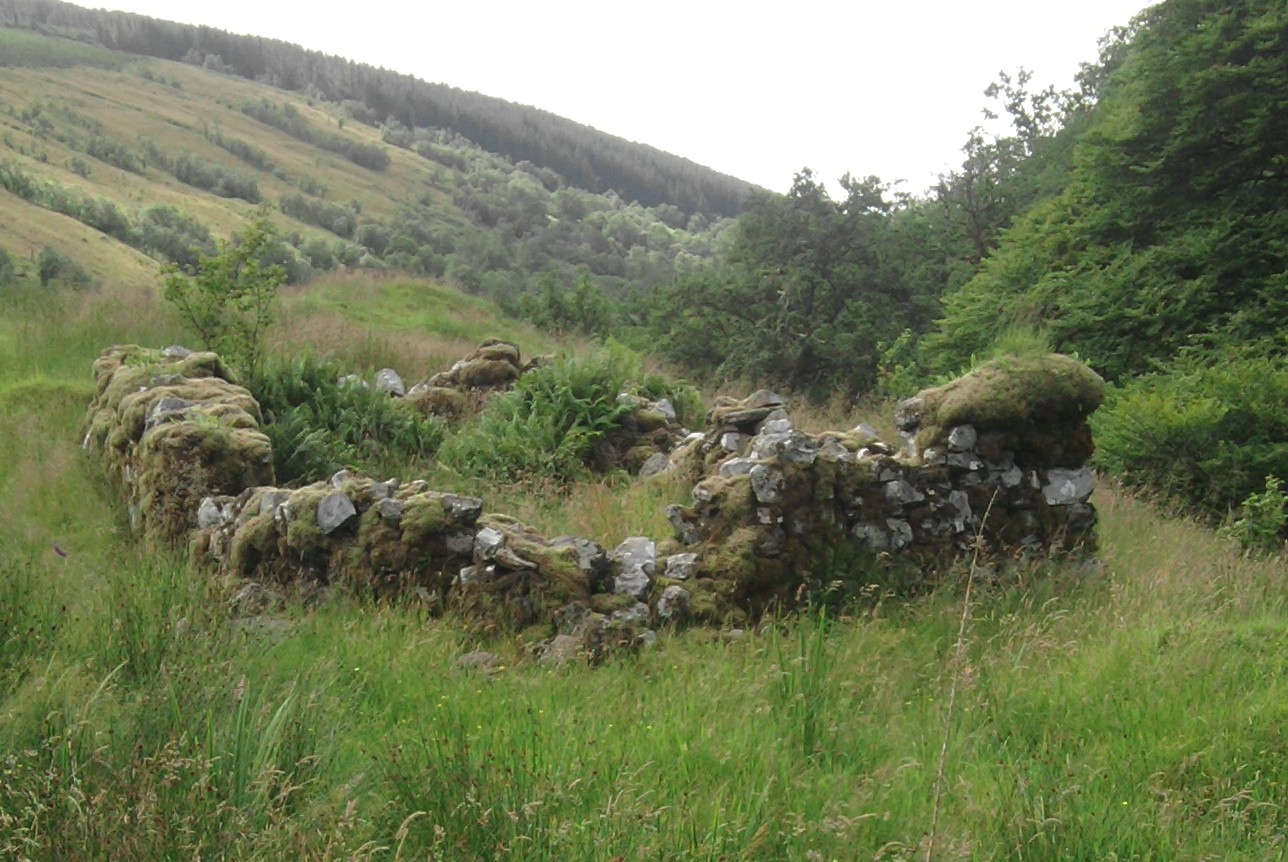
Rob Roy MacGregors house in Glen Shira

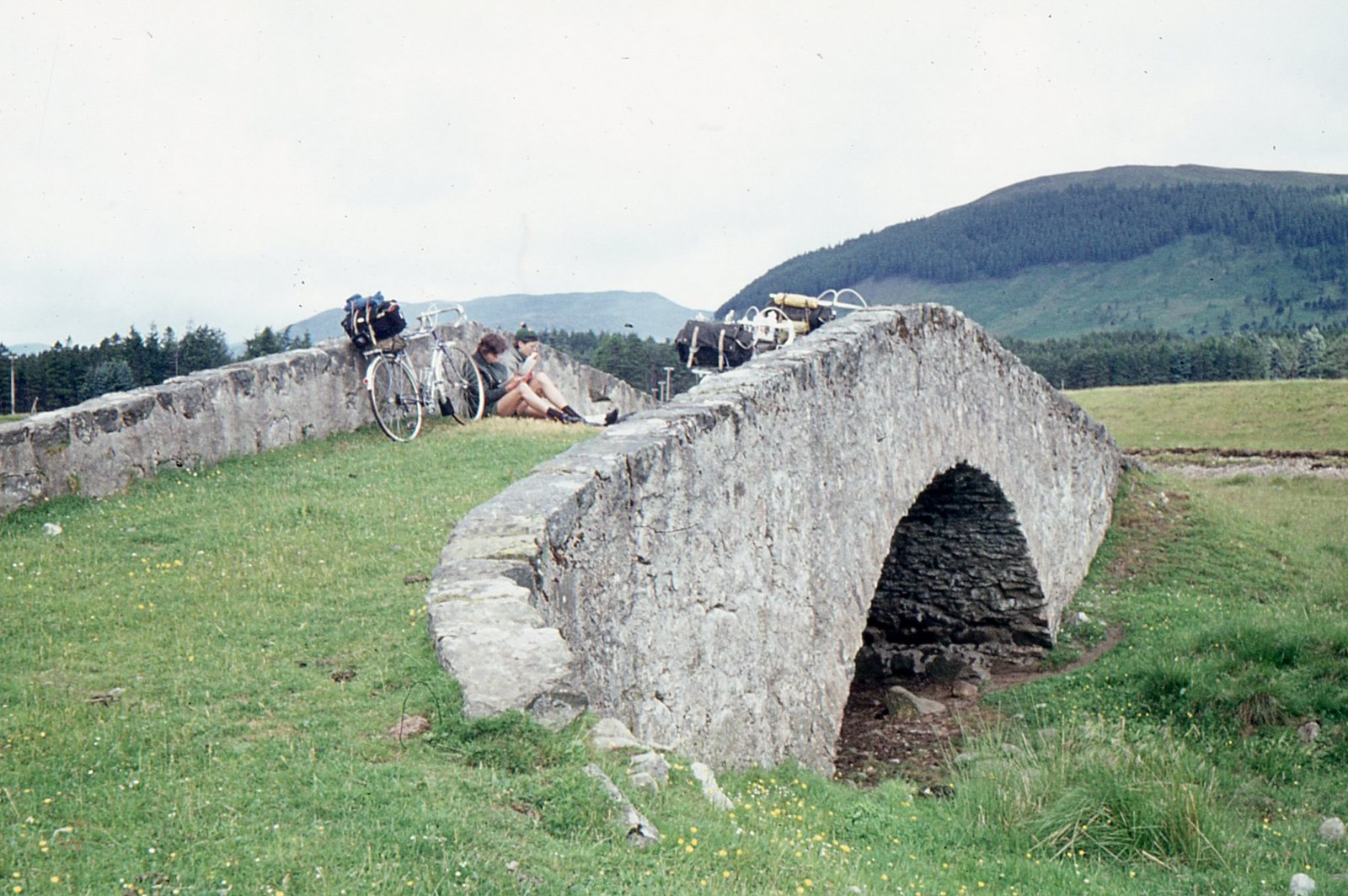
General Wade's bridge near Glen Shira

== Sources ==
- W.H. Murray, Rob Roy MacGregor, His Life and Times, Conongate Books Ltd., 3rd ed. (1996).
