= Cove, Argyll =

Coordinates: 55.998°N 4.852°W

Cove
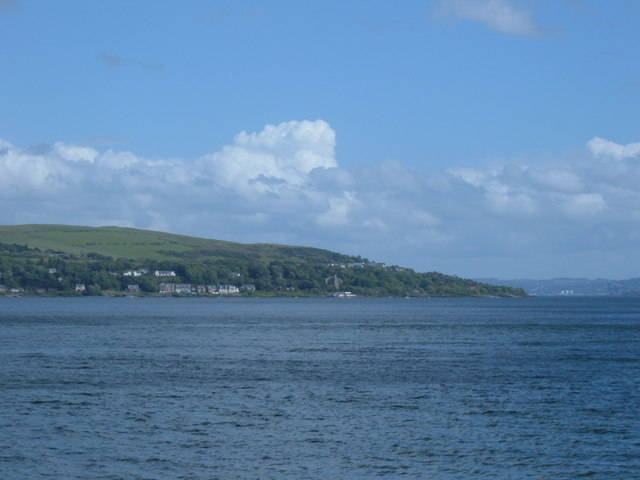
- Cove and the Rosneath peninsula seen from Blairmore, on the Cowal peninsula, across Loch Long.

- Location within Argyll and Bute
- OS grid reference: NS 22237 82010
- Council area: Argyll and Bute
- Lieutenancy area: Dunbartonshire
- Country: Scotland
- Sovereign state: United Kingdom
- Post town: Helensburgh
- Postcode district: G84
- Dialling code: 01436
- UK Parliament: Argyll, Bute and South Lochaber
- Scottish Parliament: Dumbarton

Cove is a village on the south-west coast of the Rosneath Peninsula, on Loch Long, in Argyll and Bute, western Scotland.

== History ==
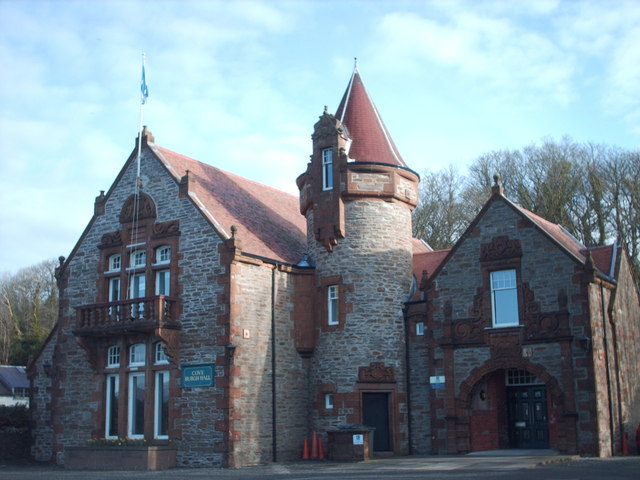
Cove Burgh Hall

Historically in Dunbartonshire, before the local government reorganisation in Scotland in 1975 it formed part of the small Joint Burgh of Cove and Kilcreggan. It remained in Dumbarton District until 1996 when it was transferred to Argyll and Bute with the rest of the peninsula.

In common with many villages in the area, Cove provided summer lodgings for the families of wealthy Glasgow merchants, shipowners and businesspeople in the 19th century. Several of the large houses have either been converted or have gone. Houses by Alexander "Greek" Thomson around Cove include: Knockderry Castle, Craigrownie Castle, Glen Eden, Craig Ailey, Ferndean and Seymour Lodge, all dating from the 1850s.

Hartfield, designed by Campbell Douglas and completed in 1859, was the summer residence of James Burns, 3rd Baron Inverclyde and later became a YMCA hostel before its dereliction and demolition in the 1960s.

Craigrownie Parish Church Cove was completed in 1852, serves the communities of Ardpeaton, Cove and Kilcreggan. The church hall, which was built as a church for the United Presbyterian Church and was completed in 1869, is a building at risk. Cove Burgh Hall was completed in 1893.
