= River Shira =

River in Argyll and Bute, Scotland

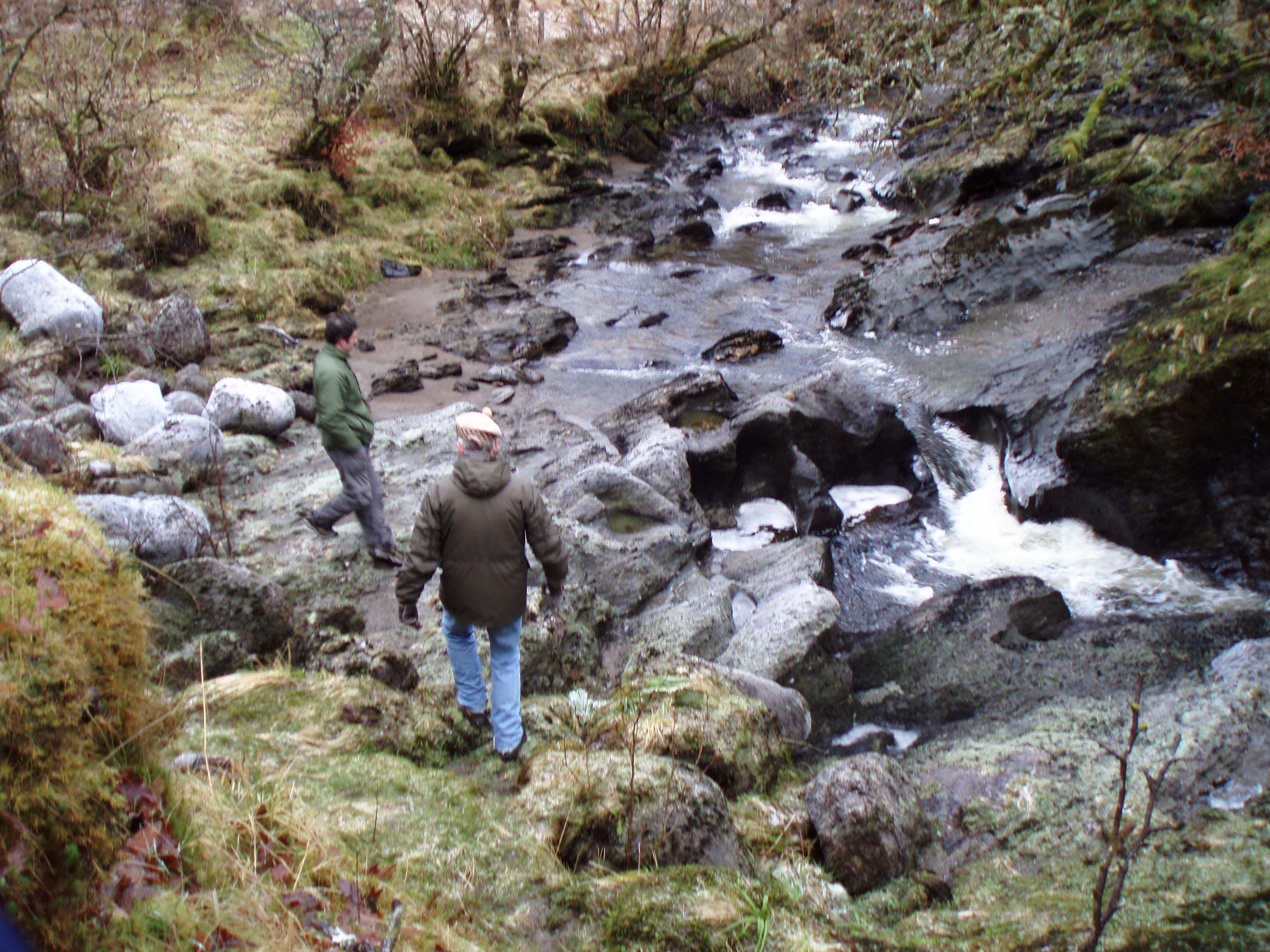
- The River Shira, just north of Eilean an Eagail
- Native name: Abhainn Siara (Scottish Gaelic)

Physical characteristics
- Source
  - location: Close to, Lochan Sron Mor
  - coordinates: 56°19′57″N 04°57′47″W
- Mouth
  - location: Loch Dubh
  - coordinates: 56°15′30″N 05°02′20″W

River Shira (Scottish Gaelic: Siara / Abhainn Siara) is the river that runs for about 7 miles through Glen Shira, in Argyll and Bute, west of Scotland. Originating to the north-east at 350 metres (1,150 ft) altitude, near the start of the River Fyne.

The river runs into the Lochan Shira reservoir, feeding the 5 MW Sron Mor (Big Nose), Shira Hydro-Electric Scheme, at 340 metres (1,120 ft) altitude and dropping 49 metres (161 ft). The river includes a few waterfalls and islands, including Eilean an Eagail (The Island of Fear).

The River Shira flows into Loch Dubh (Black Lake), where the Ancient Clan MacNaghten castle and crannogs used to be situated, then passes Stuart Liddell's house. Loch Dubh drains through the short (River Garron), then flows under the Garron Bridge into Loch Fyne, a sea loch.Gearr Abhainn

The river lends its name to the ferry MV Loch Shira.

== Gallery ==
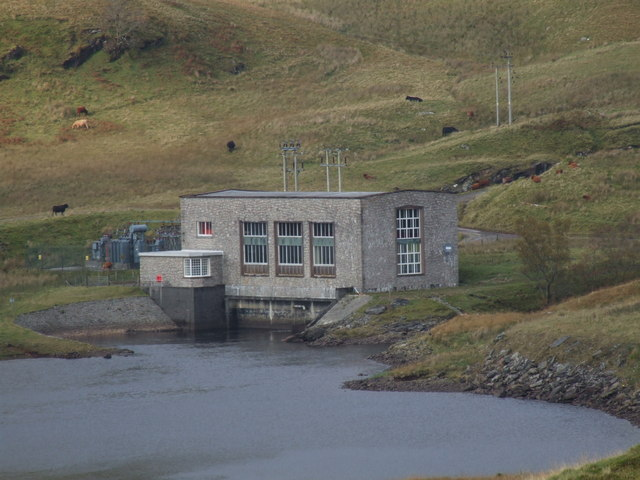
Sron More Power Station

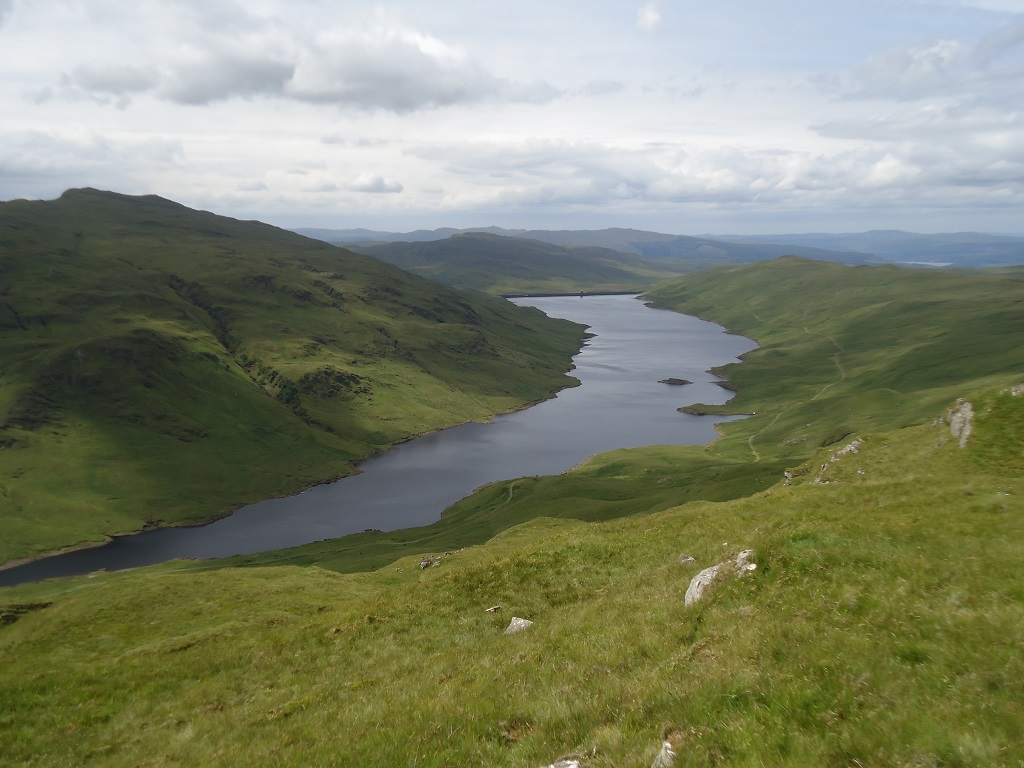
Lochan Shira

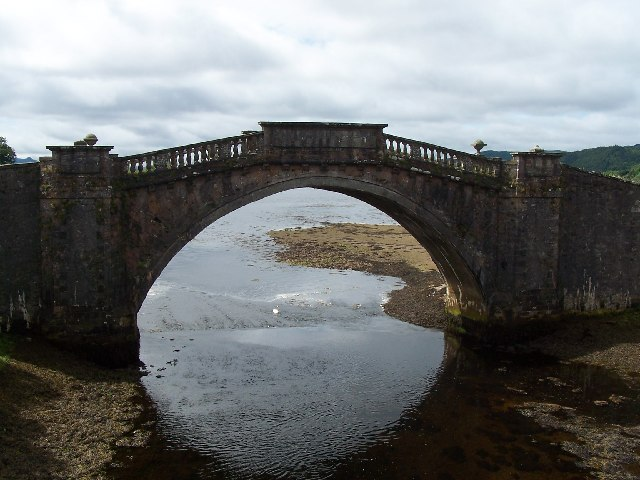
Garron Bridge, River Shira

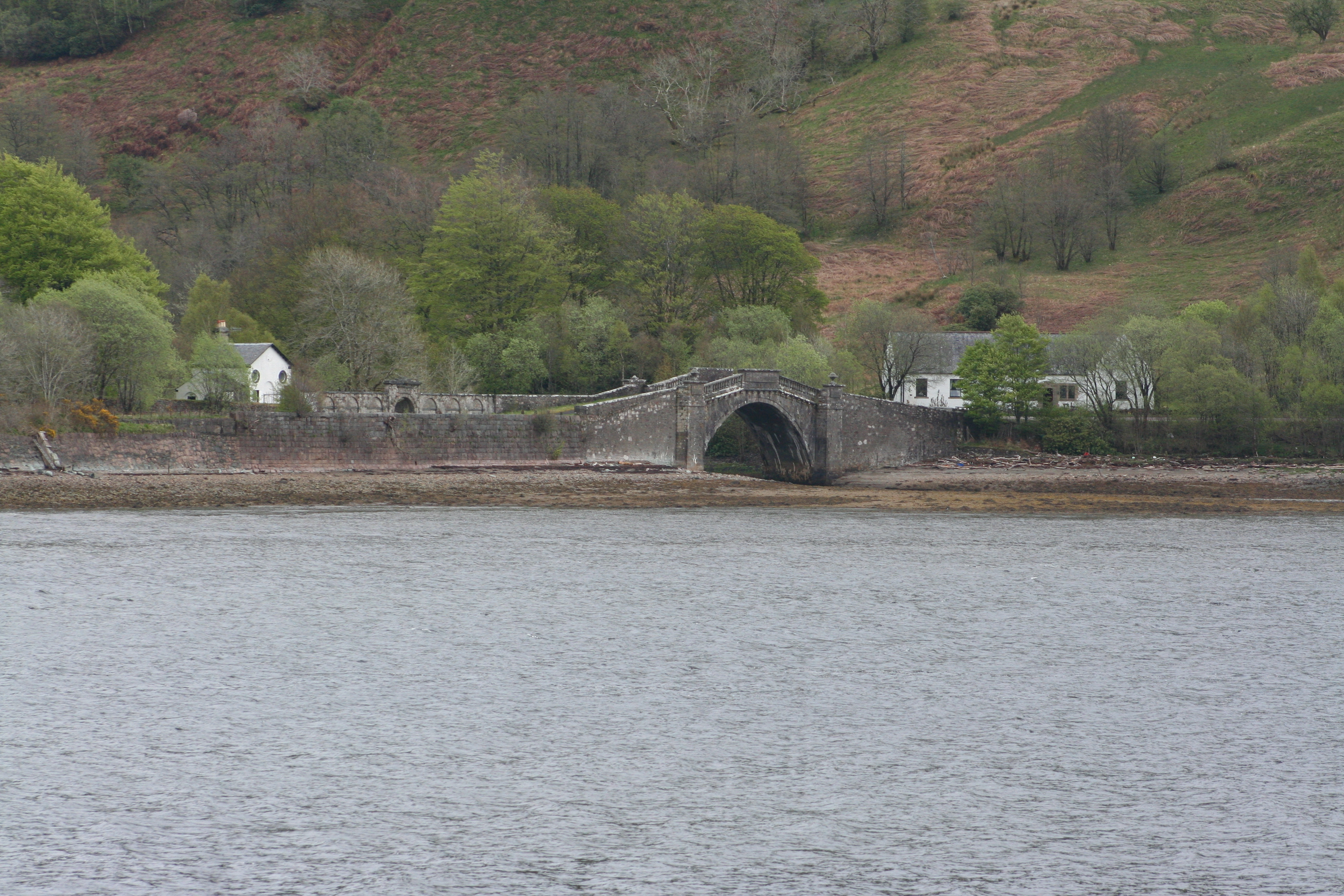
Scotland Argyll Bute Inveraray Garron Bridge
