= Knockderry Castle =

Country house in Argyll and Bute, Scotland

Coordinates: 56.0103°N 4.8618°W

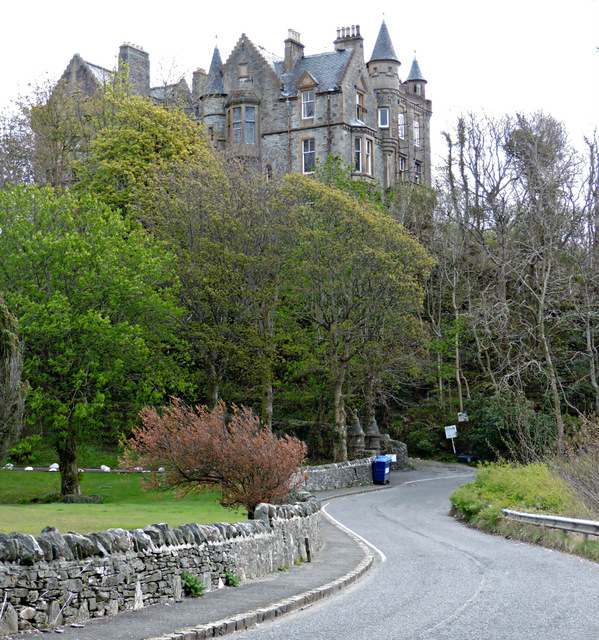
Knockderry Castle

Knockderry Castle, is a house on the Shore Road in Cove on the Rosneath Peninsula, in Argyll and Bute, west of Scotland. Designed by Alexander "Greek" Thomson in the 1850s. Baronial additions by William Leiper were added in 1897. It is category A listed with Historic Environment Scotland.

The house was built for James Templeton, a manufacturer of textiles. When alterations and expansion started in 1896, the property was owned by John Templeton, a manufacturer of carpets.

Knockderry Castle was offered for sale in summer 2022 following a 22-year-long legal battle that started with business debts allegedly not paid by the owner, Marian Van Overwaele. She became sequestrated (declared bankrupt) in 2000; in March 2022 her brother, George Amil, in whose name the property had been placed, was evicted with his family. The building had by that time deteriorated.

In February 2023, American couple David and Chelom Leavitt bought the property for £1.15M. David is a lawyer and ex state prosecutor who was involved in the Nicholas Alahverdian (aka Nicholas Rossi) case, and Chelom an assistant professor at Brigham Young University in Utah.
