= Auchindrain =

Coordinates: 56.1794°N 5.1763°W

Auchindrain: Scottish Gaelic: Achadh an Droighinn
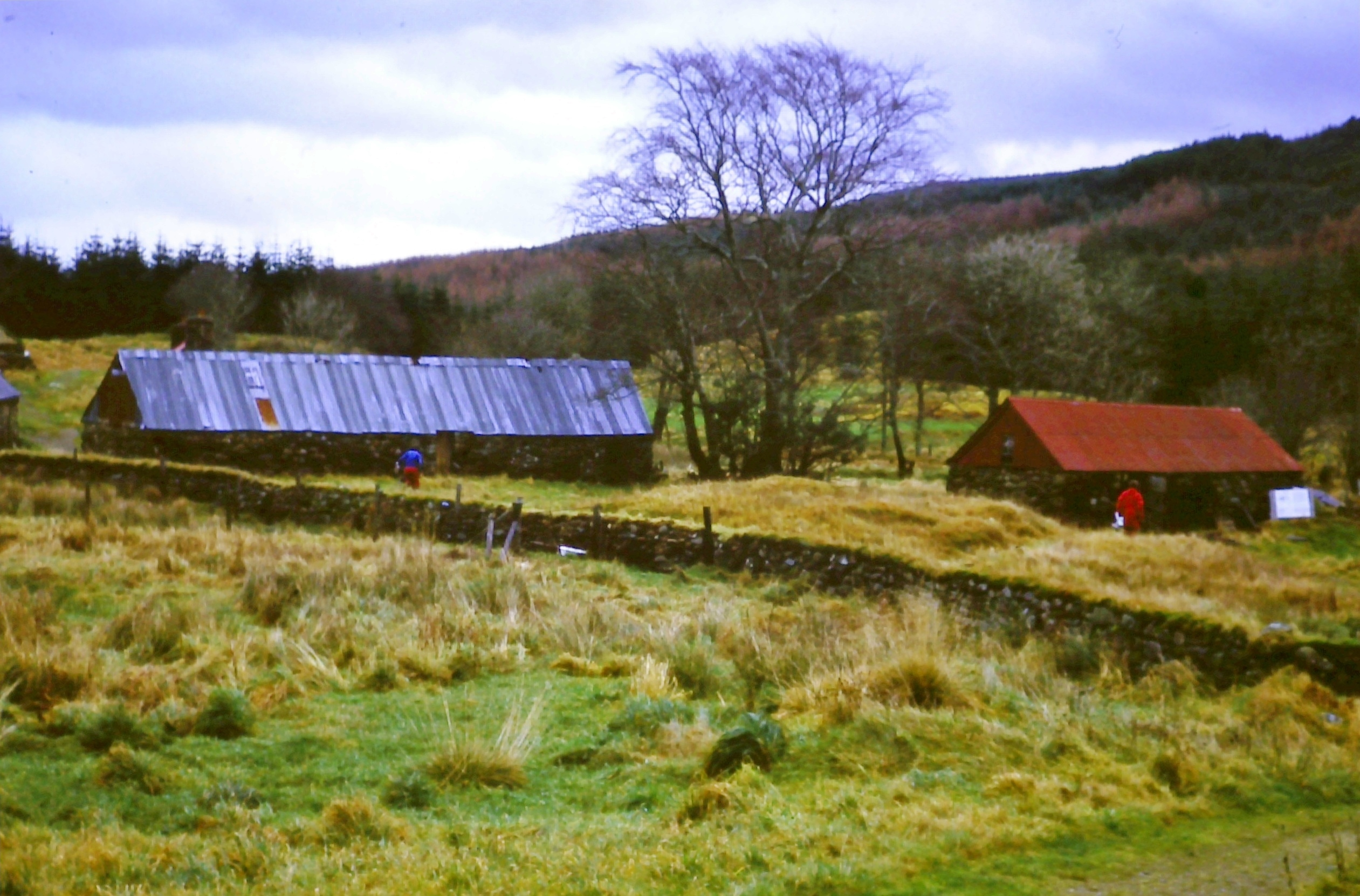
- Auchindrain Township Open Air Museum

- Location within Argyll and Bute
- OS grid reference: NN 03099 03161
- Council area: Argyll and Bute
- Country: Scotland
- Sovereign state: United Kingdom
- Post town: Inveraray
- Postcode district: PA32

Auchindrain (Scottish Gaelic: Achadh an Droighinn: 'thorn field') lies on the A83, 6 miles (10 km) south of Inveraray in Argyll and Bute, Scotland. It is the only township to survive substantially unaltered from amongst the many hundreds that existed across the Scottish Highlands before the Highland Clearances of the late 18th and 19th centuries. The 22-acre site is open to the public as the Auchindrain Township Open Air Museum.

== History ==
Achadh an Droighinn (Auchindrain) is first found in documentary references from the early 16th century. At this time the settlement was clearly an established one. It is not known precisely when the township was initially established, but because of its location on the relatively high and poor ground of the watershed between two rivers, the “field of….” in its name, and its nearness to the former township site of Bràigh Leacann (Braleckan), it is suggested that it may very well have been founded through “splitting” of the Braleckan township as a result of population growth in the late medieval period.

From the early 1500s to the 1770s Auchindrain was just another township, one of thousands spread across Scotland. Almost nothing is known about this period other than the identities of successive owners or principal tenants, and the appearance of some of the township's people's names where they appear in legal documents.

In 1776 the Duke of Argyll reacquired the township, the Duke and his chamberlain (factor) were early enthusiasts for the principles of agricultural improvement. Auchindrain is included in a list from 1779 of all those living on the Duke's land. A plan was made in 1789, by the surveyor George Langlands, for the township to be rebuilt and reorganised into crofts as many of the other townships in were. In Auchindrain this was never implemented, possibly because the investment required would not have justified the financial return.

In 1875, when Queen Victoria was staying at Inveraray Castle, she visited what she called the "primitive villages" of Auchindrain and Achnagoul (between here and Inveraray).

== Open air museum ==
The site is open to the public as the Auchindrain Township Open Air Museum between April and September each year. The major feature of the museum is the 22 buildings and building remains of the township. Twelve of these buildings are mainly complete, with the remains of the other 10 either needing or undergoing restoration work. Much of this work is carried out by volunteers and enthusiasts like the West of Scotland Dry Stone Walling Association.

Also within the 22 acres (9 ha) of museum grounds are other man-made structures in various condition of repair, including stone dykes, stackyards, stack bases, kailyards, middens, pathways, roads, a corn kiln and evidence of run rig farming methods.

The site is designated as a Conservation Area; it is Category A Listed in its entirety, and its buildings are a Recognised Collection – one of only a few collections not held by National Museums and National Galleries of Scotland.

Auchindrain is owned and operated by an independent Scottish Charity known as The Auchindrain Trust. Thirty five years ago the Trustees of Auchindrain in Mid Argyll built a Visitor Centre after its last resident family moved out in the mid 1960s. Until 2010 the township was kept on tick over, with nature mostly prevented from encroaching, the paths kept open but the vast majority of potential visitors driving past. A previous curator, Joanne Howdle, succeeded in getting the museum added to the list of Recognised Collections of national significance, a scheme administered by Museums Galleries Scotland.

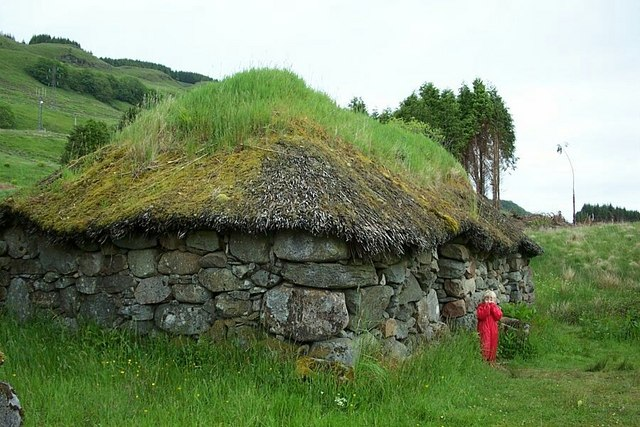
Restored blackhouse

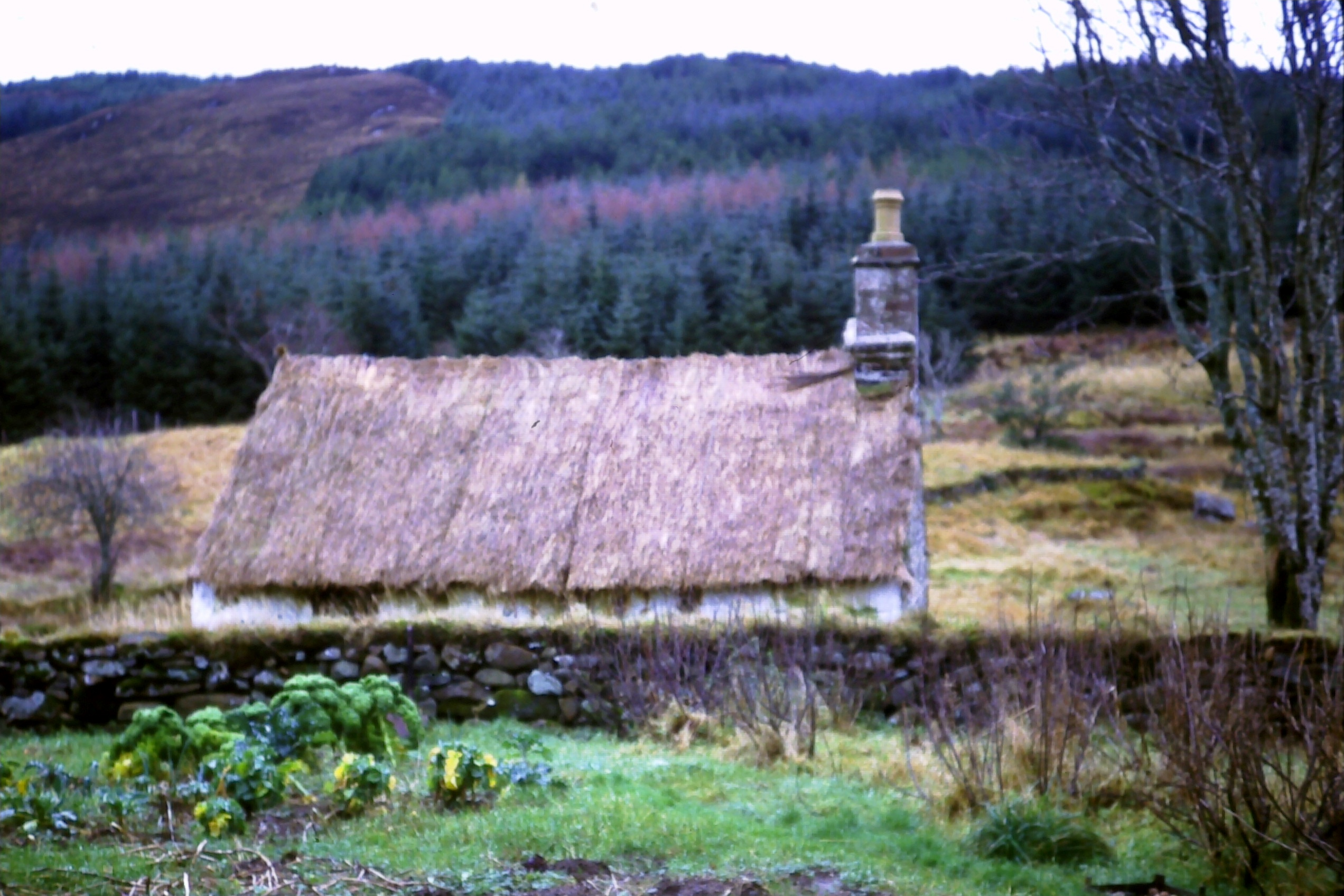
Cottage with kailyard

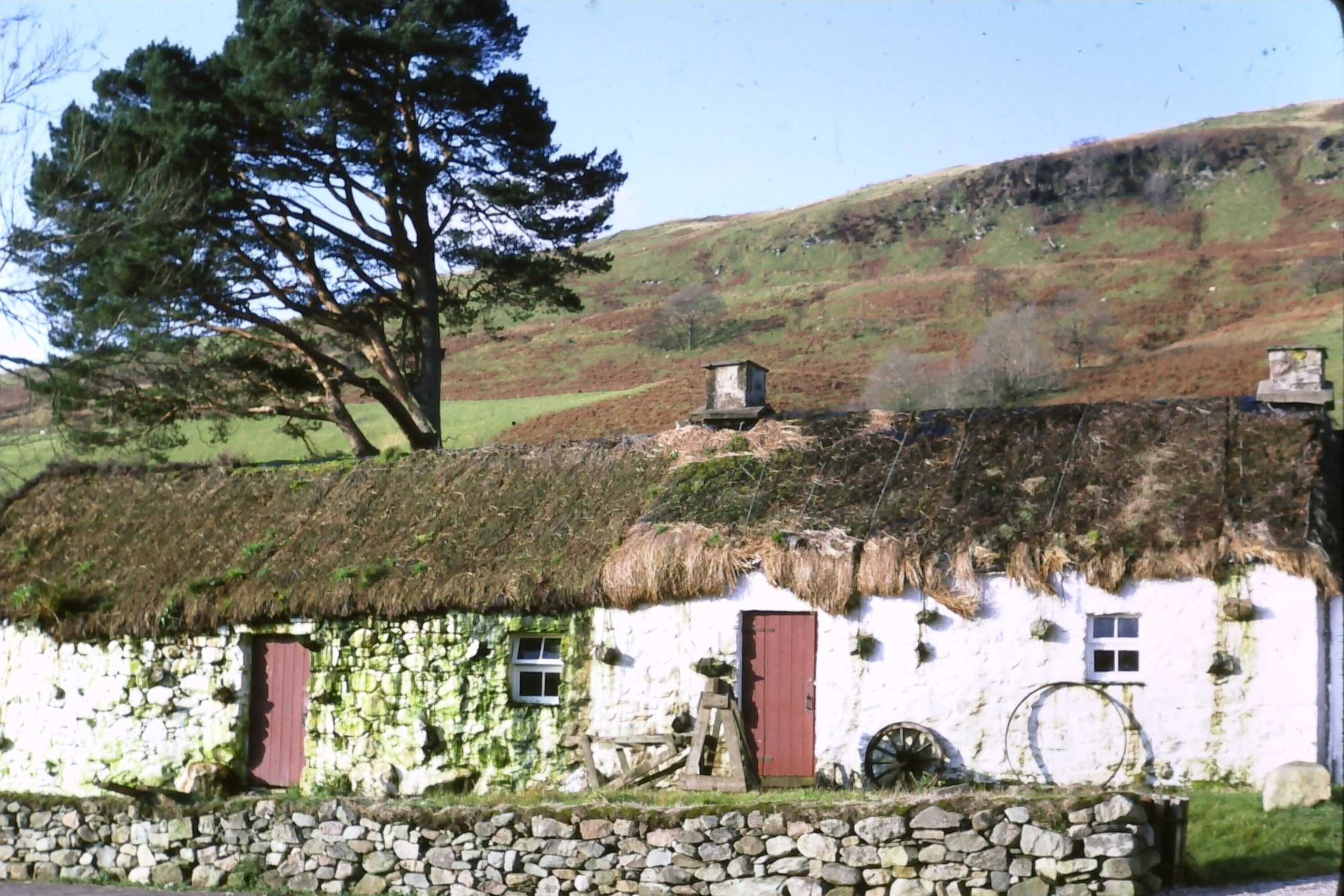
Restored cottages
