= Craig Ailey =

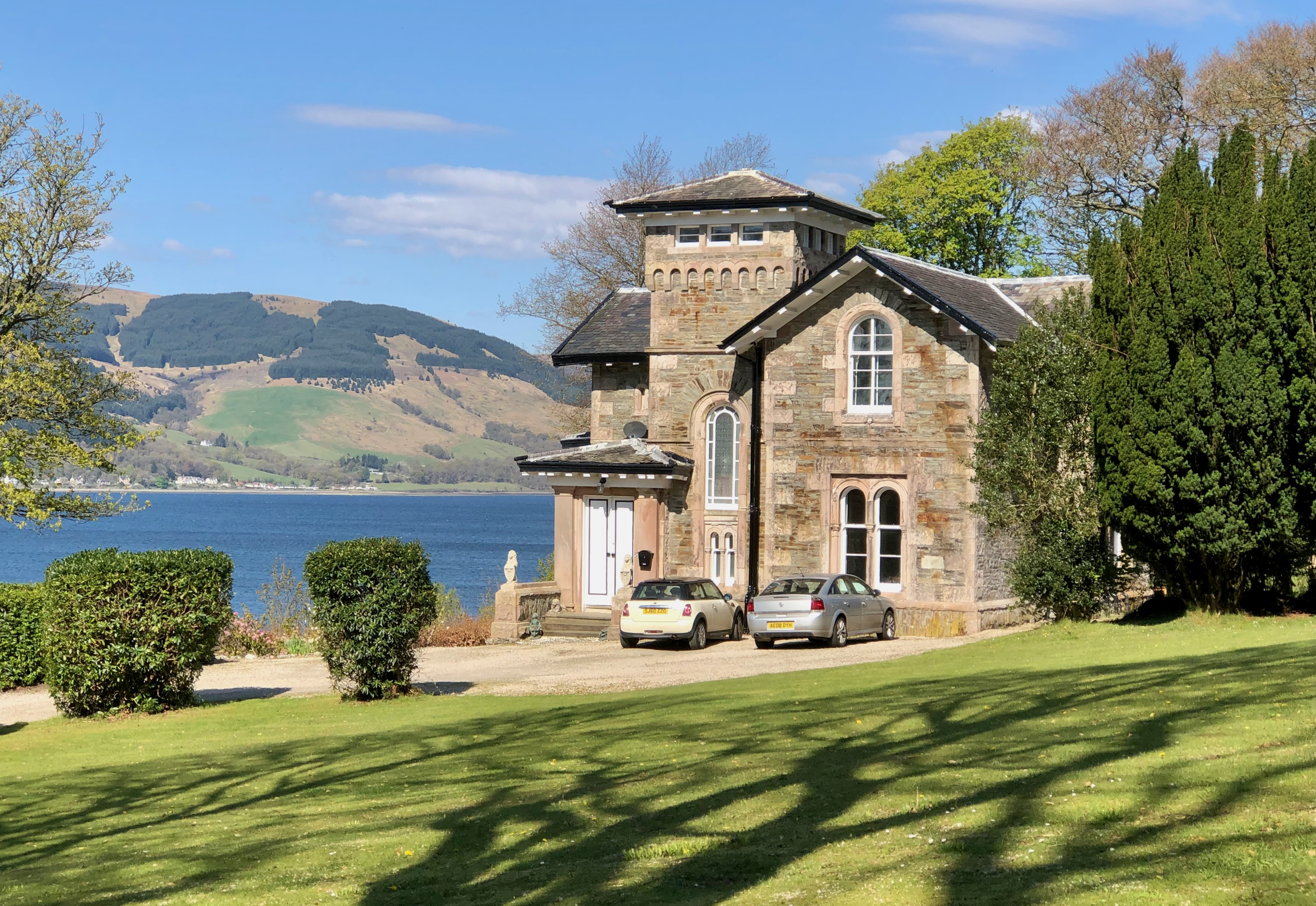
- Interactive map of the Craig Ailey area
- Former names: Italian Villa

General information
- Architectural style: Lombardic Italianate
- Location: South Ailey Road, Cove, Argyll, Scotland
- Coordinates: 55°59′32″N 4°51′07″W
- Construction started: 1850
- Estimated completion: 1852
- Client: John McElroy

Design and construction
- Architect: Alexander Thomson
- Developer: John McElroy
- Main contractor: John McElroy

Listed Building – Category A
- Designated: 14 May 1971
- Reference no.: LB43472

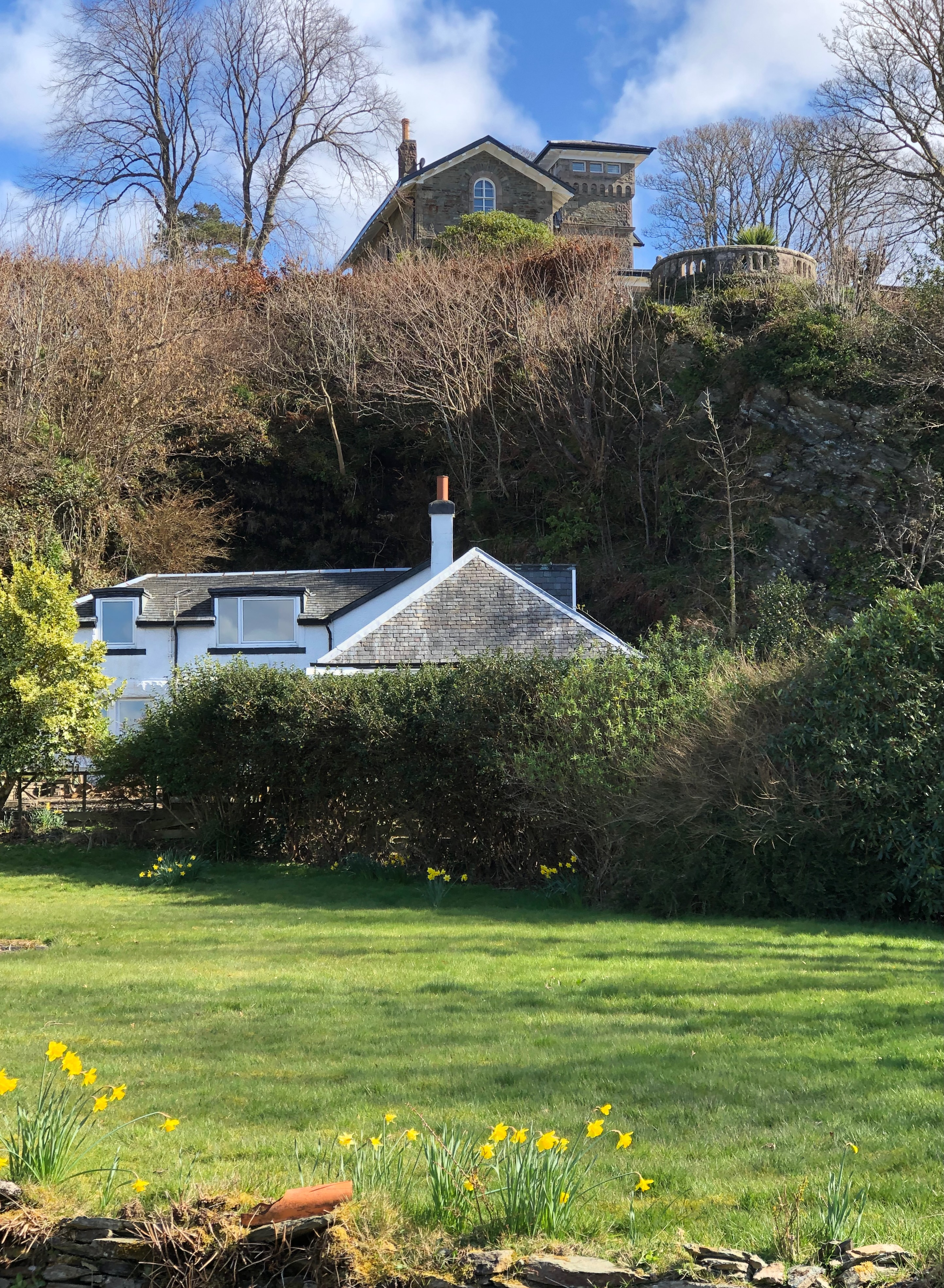
View from Shore Road of the house, perched on the crag-top above Craigrownie Cottage.

Craig Ailey is a villa at Cove, originally named Italian Villa. The site above a craig (cliff) gives views over the Firth of Clyde and its junction with Loch Long. It was designed in 1850 by Alexander Thomson (later known as "Greek Thomson"), and built around 1852 by his client the builder and developer John McElroy, who had feued land in the Cove and Kilcreggan area from the 8th Duke of Argyll. Access to the house is by South Ailey Road. The house, on top of the craig above Craigrownie Cottage, can be seen from Shore Road.
