= List of listed buildings in Rothesay, Bute =

This is a list of listed buildings in the parish of Rothesay in Argyll and Bute, Scotland.

== List ==
Name	Location	Date listed	Grid ref. (Note: Sometimes known as OSGB36, the grid reference (where provided) is based on the British national grid reference system used by the Ordnance Survey. • "Guide to National Grid". Ordnance Survey. • "Get-a-map". Ordnance Survey.)	Geo-coordinates	Notes	LB number (Note: Historic Environment Scotland assign a unique alphanumeric identifier to each designated site in Scotland, for listed buildings this always begins with "LB", for example "LB12345".)	Image
57 And 58 Mount Stuart Road, Albany Terrace, Including Boundary Walls And Gatepiers				55°50′40″N 5°01′48″W	Category B	44884	Upload Photo
37 Victoria Street				55°50′16″N 5°03′21″W	Category C(S)	44889	Upload Photo
63, 65 And 67 Victoria Street				55°50′16″N 5°03′23″W	Category C(S)	44892	Upload Photo
69 And 71 Victoria Street				55°50′16″N 5°03′25″W	Category C(S)	44893	Upload Photo
1-5 (Odd Nos) Watergate And 13 Albert Place Guildford Court Hotel				55°50′15″N 5°03′11″W	Category C(S)	44896	Upload Photo
1 And 1 1/2 York Terrace				55°50′19″N 5°03′38″W	Category C(S)	44903	Upload Photo
35 Craigmore Road, Montford House, Including Boundary Walls And Gatepiers				55°50′04″N 5°01′34″W	Category B	44830	Upload Photo
1, 1A, 2 And 2A Crichton Road Including Boundary Wall And Gatepiers				55°50′29″N 5°02′28″W	Category C(S)	44831	Upload Photo
3, 3A, 4 And 4A Crichton Road Including Boundary Wall And Gatepiers				55°50′30″N 5°02′27″W	Category C(S)	44832	Upload Photo
7 Crichton Road Including Boundary Wall				55°50′32″N 5°02′24″W	Category C(S)	44833	Upload Photo
14 And 15 Crichton Road Including Boundary Wall				55°50′34″N 5°02′18″W	Category C(S)	44835	Upload Photo
23 And 24 Crichton Road, Brighton Terrace, Including Boundary Walls And Gatepiers				55°50′36″N 5°02′08″W	Category C(S)	44837	Upload Photo
27 And 28 Crichton Road, Brighton Terrace, Including Boundary Walls And Gatepiers				55°50′36″N 5°02′05″W	Category C(S)	44839	Upload Photo
31 And 32 Crichton Road, Brighton Terrace, Including Boundary Walls And Gatepiers				55°50′36″N 5°02′02″W	Category C(S)	44841	Upload Photo
Minister's Brae, Ashlea, Rowanlea, Beechlea, Elmlea And Oaklea Including Boundary Walls				55°50′01″N 5°03′16″W	Category C(S)	44862	Upload Photo
7 And 9 Mount Pleasant Road, Eaglesham Lodge, Including Boundary Wall And Gatepiers				55°50′07″N 5°03′02″W	Category B	44870	Upload Photo
19-27 Mount Stuart Road, Wimbleton, Including Boundary Walls And Gatepiers				55°50′36″N 5°02′25″W	Category B	44873	Upload Photo
41 And 42 Mount Stuart Road, Elysium Terrace, Including Boundary Walls And Gatepiers				55°50′38″N 5°02′14″W	Category B	44876	Upload Photo
53 And 54 Mount Stuart Road, Royal Terrace, Including Boundary Walls And Gatepiers				55°50′39″N 5°02′04″W	Category B	44882	Upload Photo
1 Ardbeg Road, Woodside, Including Outbuilding, Boundary Wall And Gatepiers				55°50′51″N 5°03′49″W	Category C(S)	44773	Upload Photo
11 Argyle Place Including Boundary Wall And Gatepiers				55°50′32″N 5°03′46″W	Category C(S)	44786	Upload Photo
41 Argyle Street Including Boundary Wall, Gatepiers And Railings				55°50′25″N 5°03′40″W	Category C(S)	44790	Upload Photo
Argyle Street, 1-8 (Inclusive Nos) Grand Marine Court, Including Porch, Boundary Wall, Gatepiers And Railings				55°50′25″N 5°03′40″W	Category C(S)	44791	Upload Photo
14 And 14A Battery Place Including Boundary Wall				55°50′23″N 5°02′54″W	Category C(S)	44802	Upload Photo
10 And 12 Bishop Street, Post Office				55°50′13″N 5°03′09″W	Category B	44808	Upload Photo
8 And 9 Bishop Terrace Including Dovecot, Coach-House, Boundary Wall And Gatepiers				55°50′14″N 5°03′00″W	Category C(S)	44811	Upload Photo
Bishop Terrace, Beechwood Hotel Including Boundary Wall And Gatepiers				55°50′18″N 5°02′55″W	Category B	44812	Upload Photo
Bridgend Street, St Andrew's Church Hall, Including Piers (Formerly Bridgend Church)				55°50′14″N 5°03′29″W	Category B	44815	Upload Photo
8 Columshill Place				55°50′08″N 5°03′34″W	Category C(S)	44820	Upload Photo
26 And 28 Columshill Street				55°50′08″N 5°03′32″W	Category C(S)	40481	Upload Photo
High Kirk Of Rothesay, Ruin Of St Mary's Chapel				55°49′43″N 5°03′25″W	Category B	40447	Upload Photo
Ardencraig Road, Tor House, Including Boundary Wall, Gatepiers And Gates				55°50′28″N 5°01′37″W	Category A	40468	Upload Photo
59 And 60 Mount Stuart Road, Albany Terrace, Including Boundary Walls And Gatepiers				55°50′40″N 5°01′47″W	Category B	44885	Upload Photo
Stuart Street, Bute Museum				55°50′09″N 5°03′18″W	Category B	44888	Upload another image
39 And 41 Victoria Street				55°50′16″N 5°03′21″W	Category B	44890	Upload Photo
Westland Road, Ivybank, Including Boundary Walls And Gatepiers				55°50′15″N 5°03′39″W	Category B	44899	Upload Photo
2,4,6 And 8 West Princes Street				55°50′14″N 5°03′11″W	Category C(S)	44902	Upload Photo
24 Craigmore Road, Craigend Retirement Home Including Outbuildings, Boundary Wall And Gatepiers				55°50′12″N 5°01′33″W	Category C(S)	44827	Upload Photo
27 And 28 Craigmore Road, Orcadia, Including Boundary Wall And Gatepiers				55°50′09″N 5°01′33″W	Category B	44829	Upload Photo
10 And 11 Crichton Road Including Boundary Wall				55°50′33″N 5°02′21″W	Category C(S)	44834	Upload Photo
25 And 26 Crichton Road, Brighton Terrace, Including Boundary Walls And Gatepiers				55°50′36″N 5°02′07″W	Category C(S)	44838	Upload Photo
33 And 34 Crichton Road, Brighton Terrace, Including Boundary Walls And Gatepiers				55°50′36″N 5°02′01″W	Category C(S)	44842	Upload Photo
1-3 (Inclusive Nos) East Princes Street, Albert Mansions				55°50′14″N 5°03′06″W	Category C(S)	44845	Upload Photo
Minister's Brae, Hewison House Including Outbuildings, Boundary Walls And Gatepiers				55°50′01″N 5°03′08″W	Category C(S)	44864	Upload Photo
1, 3 And 5 Montague Street				55°50′14″N 5°03′12″W	Category C(S)	44865	Upload Photo
64, 66 And 68 Montague Street				55°50′15″N 5°03′21″W	Category C(S)	44868	Upload Photo
30-34 (Even Nos) Mount Pleasant Road Including Boundary Wall And Gatepiers				55°50′04″N 5°03′08″W	Category C(S)	44871	Upload Photo
43 And 44 Mount Stuart Road, Elysium Terrace, Including Boundary Walls And Gatepiers				55°50′39″N 5°02′12″W	Category B	44877	Upload Photo
Academy Road, 1-6 (Inclusive Nos) Academy Terrace				55°50′22″N 5°03′43″W	Category C(S)	44768	Upload Photo
14 Ardbeg Road, Tigh-Na-Mara, Including Outbuilding, Boundary Wall And Gatepier				55°51′00″N 5°03′49″W	Category B	44774	Upload Photo
Barone Road, Bute Fabrics Including Boundary Walls And Gatepiers				55°50′02″N 5°03′31″W	Category B	44799	Upload Photo
28 Battery Place, Alamein House Including Boundary Wall				55°50′26″N 5°02′48″W	Category C(S)	44806	Upload Photo
38 Bridge Street, Mavisbank, Including Boundary Walls				55°50′16″N 5°03′37″W	Category B	44813	Upload Photo
7 Craigmore Road Including Boundary Wall And Gatepiers				55°50′34″N 5°01′31″W	Category C(S)	44822	Upload Photo
15 Craigmore Road, Glencraig, Including Outbuildings, Boundary Walls And Gatepiers				55°50′29″N 5°01′29″W	Category C(S)	44823	Upload Photo
14-26 (Even Nos) Russell Street And 19, 21, 23 Mill Street				55°50′06″N 5°03′20″W	Category B	40485	Upload Photo
19-27 (Odd Nos) Bishop Street				55°50′12″N 5°03′07″W	Category C(S)	40463	Upload Photo
Ardencraig Road, Ardencraig House, Including Gatepiers				55°50′17″N 5°01′37″W	Category B	40467	Upload Photo
33 And 34 Mount Stuart Road, Elysium Terrace, Including Boundary Walls And Gatepiers				55°50′37″N 5°02′19″W	Category B	40470	Upload Photo
6 Columshill Place				55°50′08″N 5°03′33″W	Category C(S)	40479	Upload Photo
Rothesay Castle And Chapel				55°50′11″N 5°03′18″W	Category A	44887	Upload another image
Victoria Street, St Paul's Episcopal Church Including Boundary Wall				55°50′16″N 5°03′25″W	Category B	44895	Upload Photo
Westland Road, Chapelhill Villa, Including Outbuilding, Boundary Wall, Gatepiers And Gate				55°50′18″N 5°03′43″W	Category C(S)	44898	Upload Photo
23 Craigmore Road, Craigend House, Including Boundary Wall And Gatepiers				55°50′15″N 5°01′31″W	Category B	44826	Upload Photo
19, 20 And 21 Crichton Road Including Boundary Wall And Gatepiers				55°50′35″N 5°02′12″W	Category C(S)	44836	Upload Photo
45, 46 And 47 Crichton Road Including Boundary Wall And Gatepiers				55°50′36″N 5°01′49″W	Category C(S)	44843	Upload Photo
48 And 49 Crichton Road, Craigmore Hotel, Including Boundary Wall				55°50′36″N 5°01′48″W	Category B	44844	Upload Photo
1-5 (Inclusive Nos) John Street				55°50′08″N 5°03′24″W	Category C(S)	44855	Upload Photo
21, 23 And 25 Montague Street				55°50′14″N 5°03′15″W	Category C(S)	44866	Upload Photo
60 And 62 Montague Street And 3, 5 And 7 Tower Street				55°50′15″N 5°03′20″W	Category B	44867	Upload Photo
9, 10 And 10A Mount Stuart Road, Glenfaulds, Including Boundary Wall And Gatepiers				55°50′33″N 5°02′33″W	Category B	44872	Upload Photo
37, 38 And 39 Mount Stuart Road, Elysium Terrace, Including Boundary Walls And Gatepiers				55°50′38″N 5°02′16″W	Category B	44875	Upload Photo
49 And 50 Mount Stuart Road, Royal Terrace, Including Boundary Walls And Gatepiers				55°50′39″N 5°02′08″W	Category B	44880	Upload Photo
1 Alma Terrace Including Boundary Wall And Gatepiers				55°50′10″N 5°03′42″W	Category C(S)	44772	Upload Photo
7,8 And 9 Argyle Street				55°50′18″N 5°03′30″W	Category C(S)	44789	Upload Photo
15 And 16 Battery Place, Marlborough, Including Boundary Wall				55°50′23″N 5°02′53″W	Category C(S)	44803	Upload Photo
21 And 22 Battery Place Including Boundary Wall				55°50′25″N 5°02′50″W	Category C(S)	44805	Upload Photo
6,8,10 And 12 Bridgend Street (Former Bridgend Church Hall)				55°50′14″N 5°03′28″W	Category C(S)	44814	Upload Photo
16 And 18 Columshill Street				55°50′09″N 5°03′32″W	Category C(S)	44821	Upload Photo
Castle Street, Trinity Church, Including Hall, Boundary Wall, Gatepiers, Lamps And Railings				55°50′09″N 5°03′10″W	Category B	43854	Upload Photo
17, 19 And 21 Russell Street Including Boundary Wall To Union Street (Colbeck Place)				55°50′05″N 5°03′22″W	Category C(S)	40484	Upload Photo
High Kirk Of Rothesay Including Outbuilding, Graveyard, Boundary Wall And Gatepiers				55°49′43″N 5°03′26″W	Category B	40445	Upload Photo
High Kirk Of Rothesay, Bute Mausoleum				55°49′43″N 5°03′28″W	Category A	40446	Upload another image
Columshill Street, St Andrew's Roman Catholic Church, Including Priest's House, Boundary Wall And Piers				55°50′10″N 5°03′30″W	Category A	40451	Upload Photo
55, 57 And 59 High Street Bute Estate Office Including Outbuilding				55°50′10″N 5°03′14″W	Category A	40456	Upload another image See more images
Battery Place And Glenburn Road, Beattie Court (Former Aquarium) Including Stairs, Boundary Wall And Piers				55°50′28″N 5°02′45″W	Category B	40472	Upload Photo
4 Columshill Place				55°50′08″N 5°03′32″W	Category C(S)	40478	Upload Photo
Mount Stuart Road, Sewage Screening Chamber And Public Convenience				55°50′37″N 5°01′30″W	Category B	44886	Upload Photo
Well Park Road, Rock Villa Including Boundary Wall And Gatepiers				55°50′34″N 5°01′36″W	Category C(S)	44897	Upload Photo
16 Craigmore Road, Madras House, Including Boundary Walls And Gatepiers				55°50′28″N 5°01′29″W	Category C(S)	44824	Upload Photo
29 And 30 Crichton Road, Brighton Terrace, Including Boundary Walls And Gatepiers				55°50′36″N 5°02′04″W	Category C(S)	44840	Upload Photo
43 And 44 East Princes Street, Including Boundary Wall				55°50′19″N 5°02′59″W	Category C(S)	44847	Upload Photo
Glenburn Hotel, Glenfaulds Cottage				55°50′31″N 5°02′30″W	Category B	44850	Upload Photo
2 Marine Place, Moss Bank, Including Outbuilding, Boundary Walls And Gatepiers				55°51′19″N 5°03′46″W	Category C(S)	44857	Upload Photo
19 Marine Place, Frolin, Including Outbuilding And Boundary Wall				55°51′30″N 5°03′47″W	Category C(S)	44860	Upload Photo
45 And 46 Mount Stuart Road, Royal Terrace, Including Boundary Walls And Gatepiers				55°50′39″N 5°02′10″W	Category B	44878	Upload Photo
47 And 48 Mount Stuart Road, Royal Terrace, Including Boundary Walls And Gatepiers				55°50′39″N 5°02′09″W	Category B	44879	Upload Photo
51 And 52 Mount Stuart Road, Royal Terrace, Including Boundary Walls And Gatepiers				55°50′39″N 5°02′06″W	Category B	44881	Upload Photo
55 And 56 Mount Stuart Road, Albany Terrace, Including Boundary Walls And Gatepiers				55°50′40″N 5°01′49″W	Category B	44883	Upload Photo
Academy Road, Rothesay Academy Including Retaining Wall, Boundary Wall And Gatepiers				55°50′20″N 5°03′46″W	Category B	44767	Upload Photo
20 And 21 Ardbeg Road Including Outbuilding, Boundary Wall And Piers				55°51′02″N 5°03′47″W	Category C(S)	44776	Upload Photo
53 Ardbeg Road Including Outbuilding, Boundary Wall And Piers				55°51′15″N 5°03′47″W	Category C(S)	44778	Upload Photo
63 Ardbeg Road Including Outbuilding, Boundary Wall And Gatepiers				55°51′19″N 5°03′50″W	Category C(S)	44779	Upload Photo
Ardbeg Road, Ardbeg Baptist Church Including Boundary Wall, Gatepiers And Railings				55°50′56″N 5°03′49″W	Category B	44780	Upload Photo
9 And 10 Battery Place Including Boundary Wall				55°50′22″N 5°02′56″W	Category C(S)	44800	Upload Photo
5 Bishop Terrace Including Boundary Wall And Gatepiers				55°50′12″N 5°03′02″W	Category C(S)	44810	Upload Photo
7 And 9 Castle Street, Bute Housing Association				55°50′11″N 5°03′11″W	Category B	44816	Upload Photo
34 Castle Street, Including Boundary Wall And Gatepiers				55°50′09″N 5°03′08″W	Category C(S)	44818	Upload Photo
61 And 67 High Street Including Rear Outbuilding (No 65)				55°50′09″N 5°03′15″W	Category B	40457	Upload Photo
3 Stuart Street				55°50′09″N 5°03′16″W	Category B	40459	Upload Photo
73 Victoria Street				55°50′16″N 5°03′25″W	Category C(S)	44894	Upload Photo
22 Craigmore Road, Craigmore House, Including Sundial, Boundary Wall And Gatepiers				55°50′17″N 5°01′31″W	Category C(S)	44825	Upload Photo
90 High Street, Including Boundary Wall				55°50′01″N 5°03′21″W	Category C(S)	44852	Upload Photo
High Street, Former United Free Church, Including Boundary Wall				55°50′07″N 5°03′14″W	Category C(S)	44853	Upload Photo
7 Marine Place, Millerston House, Including Outbuilding And Boundary Wall				55°51′21″N 5°03′46″W	Category C(S)	44858	Upload Photo
22 And 22A Marine Place Including Outbuilding And Boundary Wall				55°51′30″N 5°03′48″W	Category C(S)	44861	Upload Photo
70, 72 And 74 Montague Street				55°50′16″N 5°03′22″W	Category C(S)	44869	Upload Photo
10-12 (Inclusive Nos) Albert Place				55°50′15″N 5°03′10″W	Category C(S)	44771	Upload Photo
14 Argyle Place Including Boundary Wall And Gatepiers				55°50′33″N 5°03′46″W	Category C(S)	44787	Upload Photo
26 Argyle Place, Including Boundary Wall And Gatepiers				55°50′37″N 5°03′47″W	Category B	44788	Upload Photo
33 And 35 Argyle Terrace Including Outbuilding And Boundary Wall				55°50′33″N 5°03′51″W	Category B	44797	Upload Photo
26 Castle Street				55°50′10″N 5°03′10″W	Category C(S)	44817	Upload Photo
30 Columshill Street				55°50′08″N 5°03′32″W	Category C(S)	40482	Upload Photo
West Pier, Public Convenience				55°50′11″N 5°03′18″W	Category B	40448	Upload another image See more images
2 Union Street (Colbeck Place) Including Boundary Wall				55°50′05″N 5°03′23″W	Category B	40460	Upload Photo
Ardencraig Road, Rockhill Castle, Including Boundary Walls, Terrace Walls And Verandah				55°50′26″N 5°01′34″W	Category B	40469	Upload Photo
3-9 (Odd Nos) Columshill Place				55°50′07″N 5°03′34″W	Category B	40477	Upload Photo
West Pier, Cabbies' Shelter				55°50′18″N 5°03′17″W	Category C(S)	44900	Upload Photo
Glenburn Road, East Firwood And West Firwood				55°50′26″N 5°02′34″W	Category B	44851	Upload Photo
Inner Harbour, Former Weighing House Including Weigh Bridge				55°50′16″N 5°03′13″W	Category C(S)	44854	Upload Photo
8 Marine Place, Aros-Na-Mara Including Boundary Wall And Gatepiers				55°51′22″N 5°03′46″W	Category C(S)	44859	Upload Photo
35 And 36 Mount Stuart Road, Elysium Terrace, Including Boundary Walls And Gatepiers				55°50′38″N 5°02′17″W	Category B	44874	Upload Photo
Albert Place And West Princes Street, Former Royal Hotel				55°50′15″N 5°03′08″W	Category B	44769	Upload Photo
18, 18A And 19 Ardbeg Road Including Boundary Wall				55°51′02″N 5°03′47″W	Category C(S)	44775	Upload Photo
24 And 25 Ardbeg Road Including Boundary Wall				55°51′04″N 5°03′47″W	Category C(S)	44777	Upload Photo
Ardencraig Road, Ardencraig Lodge				55°50′19″N 5°01′35″W	Category C(S)	44783	Upload Photo
1 Argyle Place Including Boundary Wall				55°50′28″N 5°03′43″W	Category C(S)	44784	Upload Photo
Argyle Street, West Church				55°50′20″N 5°03′35″W	Category B	44792	Upload Photo
31 Argyle Terrace Including Boundary Wall And Gatepiers				55°50′32″N 5°03′51″W	Category C(S)	44793	Upload Photo
Barone Road, Barone Cottage				55°49′50″N 5°04′07″W	Category C(S)	44798	Upload Photo
Argyle Street, Rothesay Pavilion Including House At Rear And Boundary Wall				55°50′25″N 5°03′43″W	Category A	40452	Upload another image
Castle Street, County Hall, Including Former Prison Cells				55°50′12″N 5°03′14″W	Category B	40453	Upload another image
Victoria Street, The Winter Gardens				55°50′18″N 5°03′20″W	Category A	40454	Upload another image
19-25 (Inclusive Nos) East Princes Street, Duncan's Halls				55°50′16″N 5°03′04″W	Category B	44846	Upload Photo
Eastlands Road, Edgehill And Hillpark, Including Outbuilding, Boundary Wall And Gatepiers				55°50′31″N 5°01′39″W	Category C(S)	44848	Upload Photo
4 King Street				55°50′13″N 5°03′22″W	Category B	44856	Upload Photo
Minister's Brae, Marionslea Including Boundary Wall And Gatepiers				55°50′01″N 5°03′14″W	Category B	44863	Upload Photo
11 And 11A Battery Place, Including Boundary Wall				55°50′22″N 5°02′55″W	Category C(S)	44801	Upload Photo
13 And 15 Bishop Street				55°50′13″N 5°03′07″W	Category C(S)	44807	Upload Photo
36 And 38 Castle Street				55°50′09″N 5°03′07″W	Category C(S)	44819	Upload Photo
20, 22 And 24 Columshill Street				55°50′09″N 5°03′32″W	Category C(S)	40480	Upload Photo
43-55 (Odd Nos) Victoria Street, Rothesay Victoria Hotel, Including Lampstands And Plaque				55°50′16″N 5°03′23″W	Category B	44891	Upload Photo
Glenburn Road, Glenburn Hotel Including Terrace Wall, Boundary Walls, Gatepiers And Cottages				55°50′30″N 5°02′33″W	Category B	44849	Upload another image
7-9 (Inclusive Nos) Albert Place And 5-9 (Odd Nos) West Princes Street				55°50′15″N 5°03′09″W	Category C(S)	44770	Upload Photo
2 Argyle Place Including Boundary Wall				55°50′28″N 5°03′44″W	Category C(S)	44785	Upload Photo
20 Battery Place, Glendale				55°50′25″N 5°02′51″W	Category B	44804	Upload Photo
4 Bishop Terrace Including Boundary Wall And Gatepiers				55°50′12″N 5°03′02″W	Category C(S)	44809	Upload Photo
Chapelhill Road, Free Church Of Scotland, Including Boundary Walls				55°50′19″N 5°03′40″W	Category B	43855	Upload Photo
32 Columshill Street And 2 Columshill Place				55°50′08″N 5°03′32″W	Category B	40483	Upload Photo
51 And 53 High Street				55°50′10″N 5°03′14″W	Category B	40455	Upload Photo
Market Cross, High Street				55°50′09″N 5°03′16″W	Category C(S)	40458	Upload Photo

== Key ==
The scheme for classifying buildings in Scotland is:

- Category A: "buildings of national or international importance, either architectural or historic; or fine, little-altered examples of some particular period, style or building type."
- Category B: "buildings of regional or more than local importance; or major examples of some particular period, style or building type, which may have been altered."
- Category C: "buildings of local importance; lesser examples of any period, style, or building type, as originally constructed or moderately altered; and simple traditional buildings which group well with other listed buildings."

In March 2016 there were 47,288 listed buildings in Scotland. Of these, 8% were Category A, and 50% were Category B, with the remaining 42% being Category C.

== See also ==
- List of listed buildings in Argyll and Bute
