= County Building =

County Building may refer to:

- City-County Building (Indianapolis), Indiana, United States
- County-City Building (South Bend), Indiana, United States
- Denver City and County Building, Colorado, United States
- Guardian Building, Detroit, Michigan, United States, houses Wayne County administrative offices
- Salt Lake City and County Building, Utah, United States
- Wayne County Building, Detroit, Michigan, United States, former site of Wayne County administrative offices

== See also ==
- County Buildings (disambiguation)
