= City-County Building =

City-County Building may refer to:

- Coleman A. Young Municipal Center, Detroit, Michigan
- Denver City and County Building, Denver, Colorado
- City-County Building (Indianapolis), Indiana
- Knoxville City-County Building, Knoxville, Tennessee
- Pittsburgh City-County Building, Pittsburgh, Pennsylvania
- Salt Lake City and County Building, Salt Lake City, Utah
- County-City Building (South Bend), Indiana
- City and County Building (Cheyenne, Wyoming)
