= County Buildings =

County Buildings may refer to:

- County Buildings, Aberdeen, Scotland
- County Buildings, Alloa, Scotland
- County Buildings, Ayr, Scotland
- County Buildings, Carlow, Ireland
- County Buildings, Cupar, Scotland
- County Buildings, Dingwall, Scotland
- County Buildings, Dumbarton, Scotland
- County Buildings, Dumfries, Scotland
- County Buildings, Duns, Scotland
- County Buildings, Enniskillen, Northern Ireland
- County Buildings, Forfar, Scotland
- County Buildings, Haddington, Scotland
- County Buildings, Kinross, Scotland
- County Buildings, Kirkcudbright, Scotland
- County Buildings, Lerwick, Scotland
- County Buildings, Linlithgow, Scotland
- County Buildings, Mullingar, Ireland
- County Buildings, Peebles, Scotland
- County Buildings, Perth, Scotland
- County Buildings, Selkirk, Scotland
- County Buildings, Stafford, Scotland
- County Buildings, Wicklow, Ireland
- County Buildings, Wrexham, Wales

== See also ==
- Lanark County Buildings, Scotland
- Nairn Town and County Buildings, Scotland
- Old Hancock County Buildings, Ellsworth, Maine
- Rothesay Town Hall and County Buildings, Scotland
- Wigtown County Buildings, Scotland
- County Building (disambiguation)
