= Glenburn Hotel =

Hotel in Argyll and Bute, Scotland

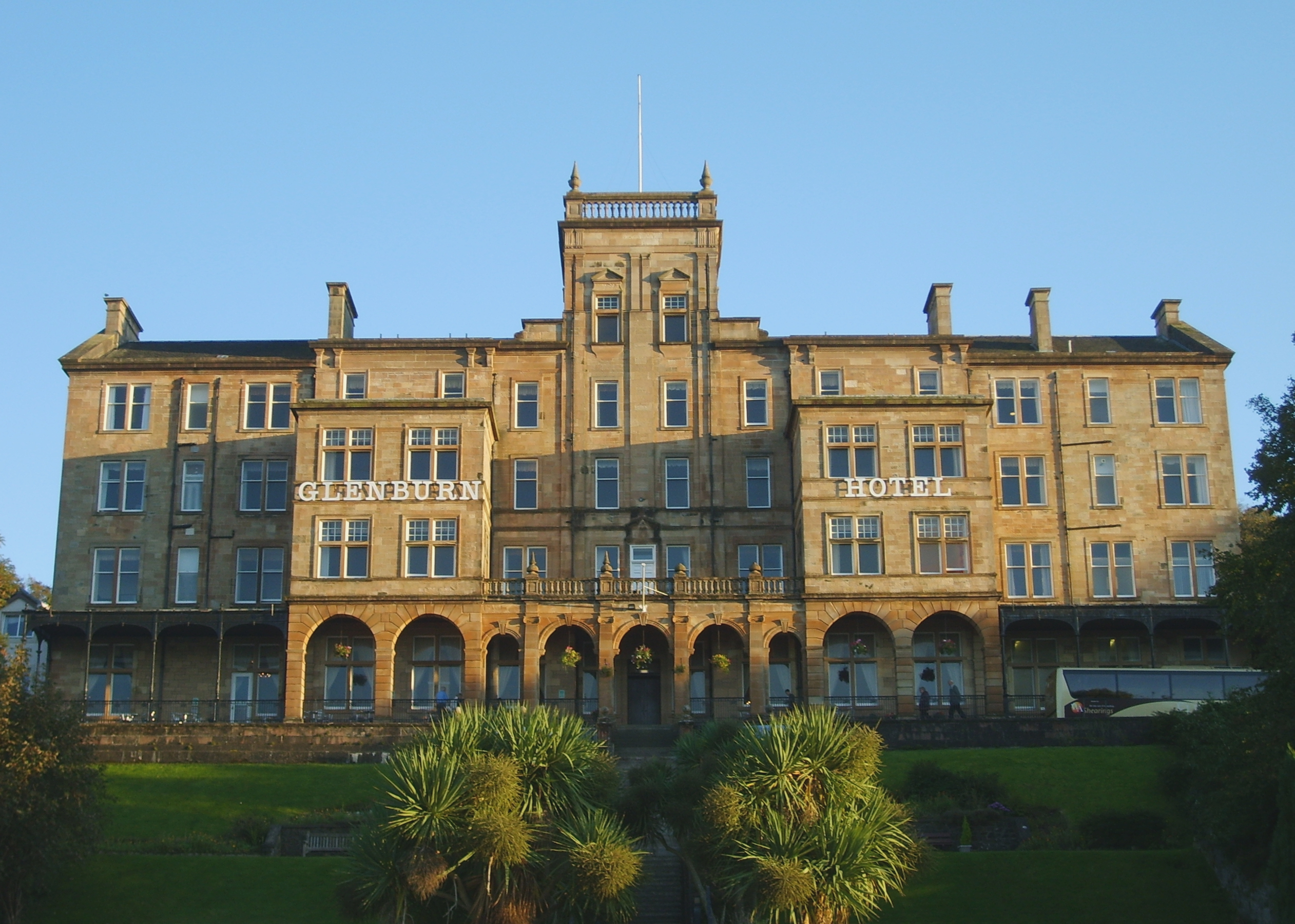
- The hotel in 2010

- Location within Scotland Glenburn Hotel (Argyll and Bute)
- Alternative names: The Hydro

General information
- Location: Glenburn Road, Rothesay, Argyll and Bute, Scotland
- Coordinates: 55.84153°N 5.04262°W
- Opening: 1843

Technical details
- Floor count: 5 (including basement)

Other information
- Number of rooms: 121

Website
- https://bespokehotels.com/glenburn-hotel/

The Glenburn Hotel is a hotel located on Glenburn Road in Rothesay, Argyll and Bute, Scotland. It is a Category B listed building built in the first half of the 19th century. It opened for business in 1843. It was rebuilt, in ashlar stone, in 1892, on a grander scale, after a fire. It was originally Glenburn Hydropathic, Scotland's first spa. A brick chimney to the east of the property served the laundry and the steam heating.

The hotel, which has 121 bedrooms, is known colloquially, especially amongst the older generation, as the Hydro.

The Glenburn was extensively refurbished in 2016. It has been closed since November 2020 because of the COVID-19 pandemic, with staff initially being placed on furlough. In March 2022, it was announced that the hotel has been sold to the hotel group Bespoke Hotels for an undisclosed sum.

== Gallery ==
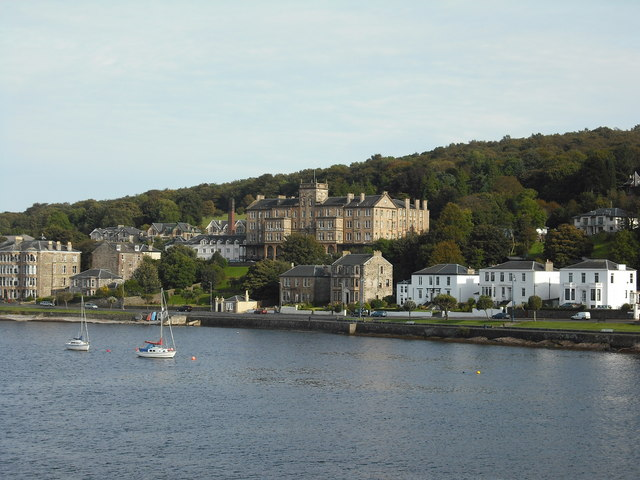
Viewed from Rothesay Bay, 2009

== See also ==
- List of listed buildings in Argyll and Bute
