= Rothesay Town Hall and County Buildings =

Municipal building in Rothesay, Scotland

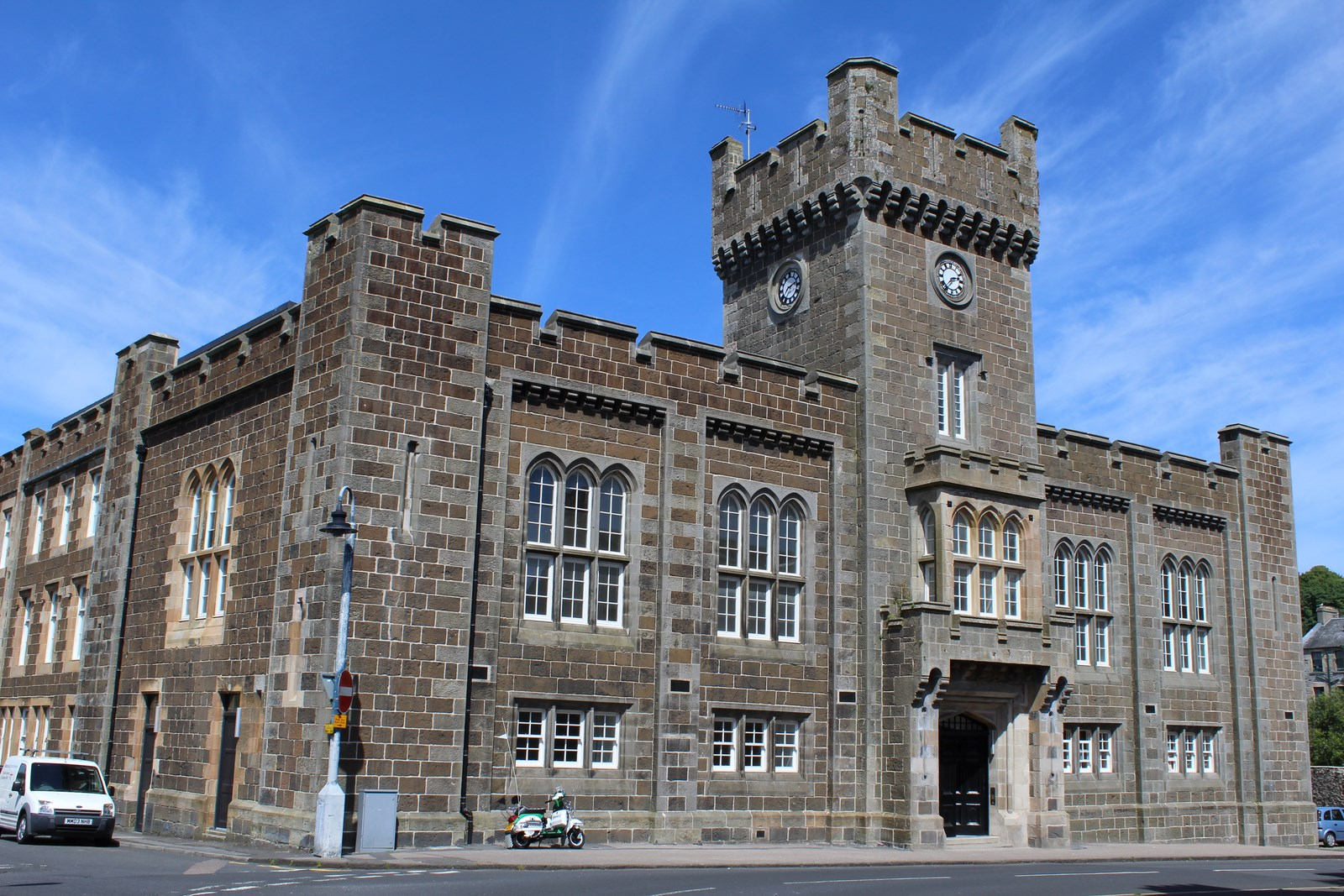
- Rothesay Town Hall and County Buildings

- Shown on Bute
- 55.8364°N 5.0538°W
- Location: Castle Street, Rothesay

History
- Built: 1835

Site notes
- Architect: James Dempster
- Architectural style: Gothic Revival style

Listed Building – Category B
- Official name: 31 High Street (Flats 1-25, inclusive nos) (Former Castle Street, County Hall, including former prison cells)
- Designated: 2 April 1971
- Reference no.: LB40453

Rothesay Town Hall and County Buildings is a former municipal building in Castle Street, Rothesay, Scotland. The structure, which was the meeting place of Rothesay Burgh Council and of Bute County Council, is a Category B listed building.

== History ==
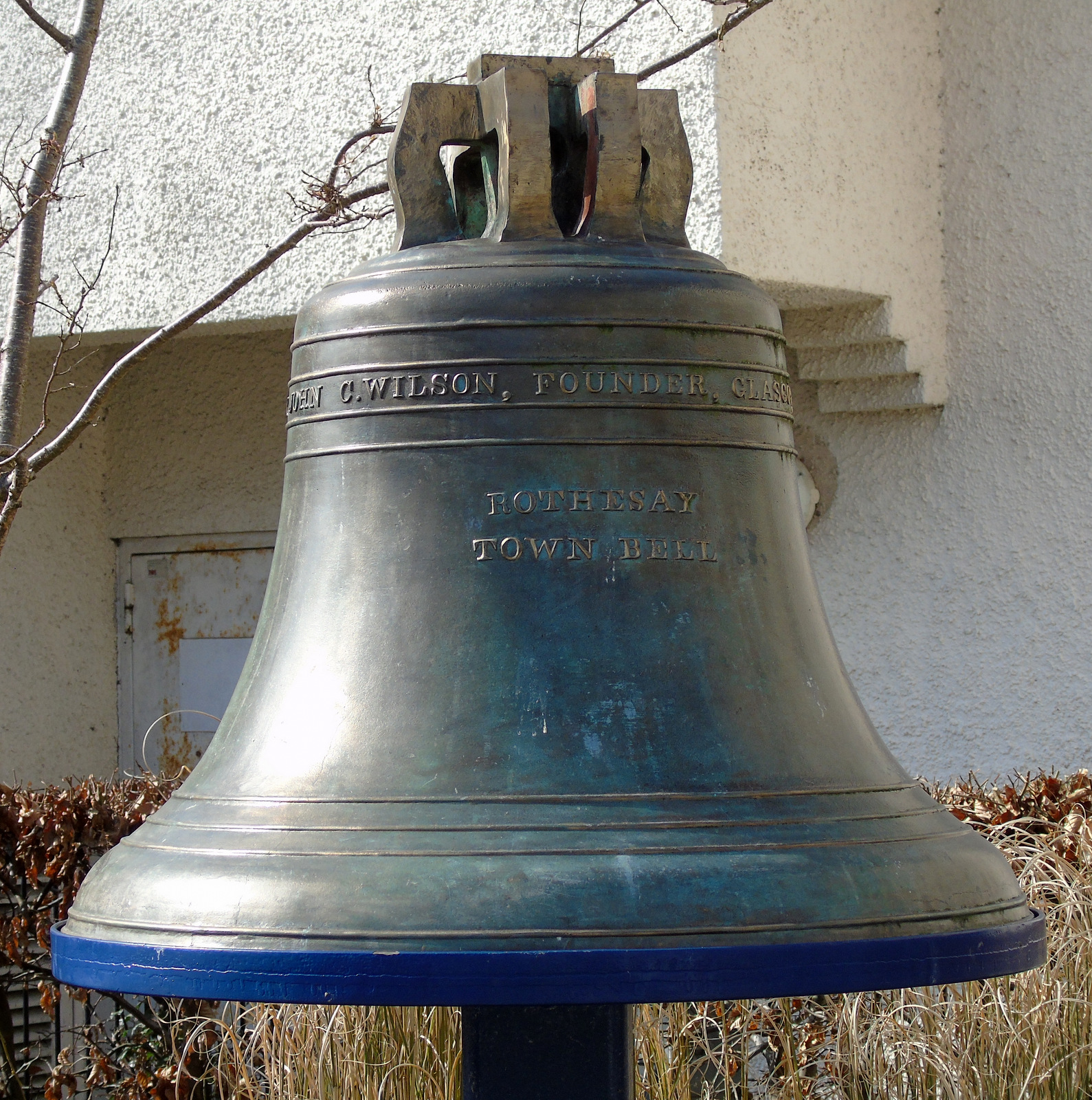
The Town Hall bell

The building was built on the site of an earlier tolbooth which incorporated cells for petty prisoners. The new building was designed by James Dempster of Greenock in the Gothic Revival style, built in ashlar stone at a cost of £4,000 and was completed in 1835.

The design involved a symmetrical main frontage with seven bays facing onto Castle Street; the central bay, which slightly projected forward, took the form of a four-stage tower. The tower featured an arched doorway on the ground floor, flanked by piers and brackets supporting a canopy, as well as a three-light bay window on the second floor, a pair of lancet windows on third floor and a clock above: it was castellated at the top and had prominent corner turrets. The clock was paid for by John Crichton-Stuart, 2nd Marquess of Bute as a gift to the town, while the town hall bell was manufactured by John C. Wilson of the Gorbals Brass and Bell Foundry in Glasgow. The sections on either side of the tower were fenestrated with three-light sash windows on the ground floor and three-light mullioned windows on the second floor, while the outer bays contained lancet windows on the first floor. Internally, the principal rooms were the courtroom, the town clerk's office and sheriff clerk's office. The town clerk was responsible for the administration of the royal burgh of Rothesay, while hearings of the sheriff's court, the burgh court and the magistrates' court all took place in the courtroom. A dedicated prison block was erected behind the main building in 1865.

Following the implementation of the Local Government (Scotland) Act 1889, which established a uniform system of county councils in Scotland and realigned the boundaries of many of Scotland's counties, Bute County Council was created in 1890: the office of the county clerk was also established in the building.

The building continued to serve as the headquarters of both Rothesay Burgh Council and Bute County Council until both bodies were replaced by Argyll and Bute District Council in 1975. The new district council continued to use the building for the delivery of local services and it remained the venue for sheriff's court hearings. An extensive programme of refurbishment works, to a design by Collective Architecture, was completed in March 2011: the works, which cost £4.3 million, involved the re-modelling of the complex around a new courtyard to the rear of the main building and the conversion of the interior of the complex into 25 new apartments. The town hall bell was recovered during the conversion and put on display in a small garden at the junction of High Street and Montague Street in 2016.

== See also ==
- List of listed buildings in Rothesay, Bute
