= Rothesay =

Town on the Isle of Bute, Scotland

Coordinates: 55°50′11″N 5°3′18″W

Rothesay: Scottish Gaelic: Baile Bhòid
- Town
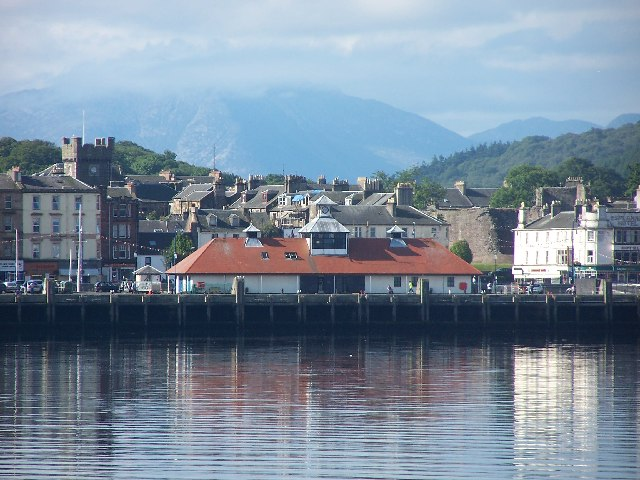
- Rothesay Pier

- Location within Argyll and Bute
- Population: 4,207 (2022)
- OS grid reference: NS 087 645
  - Edinburgh: 73 mi (117 km)
  - London: 361 mi (581 km)
- Council area: Argyll and Bute
- Lieutenancy area: Argyll and Bute
- Country: Scotland
- Sovereign state: United Kingdom
- Post town: ISLE OF BUTE
- Postcode district: PA20
- Dialling code: 01700
- UK Parliament: Argyll, Bute and South Lochaber
- Scottish Parliament: Argyll and Bute

Rothesay (/ˈrɒθsi/ ROTH-see; Scottish Gaelic: Baile Bhòid [ˈpalə ˈvɔːtʲ]) is a coastal town in Argyll and Bute, Scotland. It is the main town on the Isle of Bute, and it is situated along the coast of the Firth of Clyde. It had a population of 4,207 in 2022.

It can be reached by a Caledonian MacBrayne ferry from Wemyss Bay, which also offers an onward rail link to Glasgow Central Station. At the centre of the town is the 13th-century ruin Rothesay Castle, unique in Scotland for its circular plan.

== Etymology ==
In modern Scottish Gaelic, Rothesay is known as Baile Bhòid, meaning 'town of Bute'. The English-language name, which was written as Rothersay in 1321, Rosay around 1400, and Rothissaye around 1500, originally referred to the castle. Since the castle was surrounded by a moat connected to the sea, the name may have originally meant 'Rother's Isle' (the Old Norse suffix -ey means "isle"), or it may be an alteration of the Gaelic word rath, meaning 'fort'.

== History ==
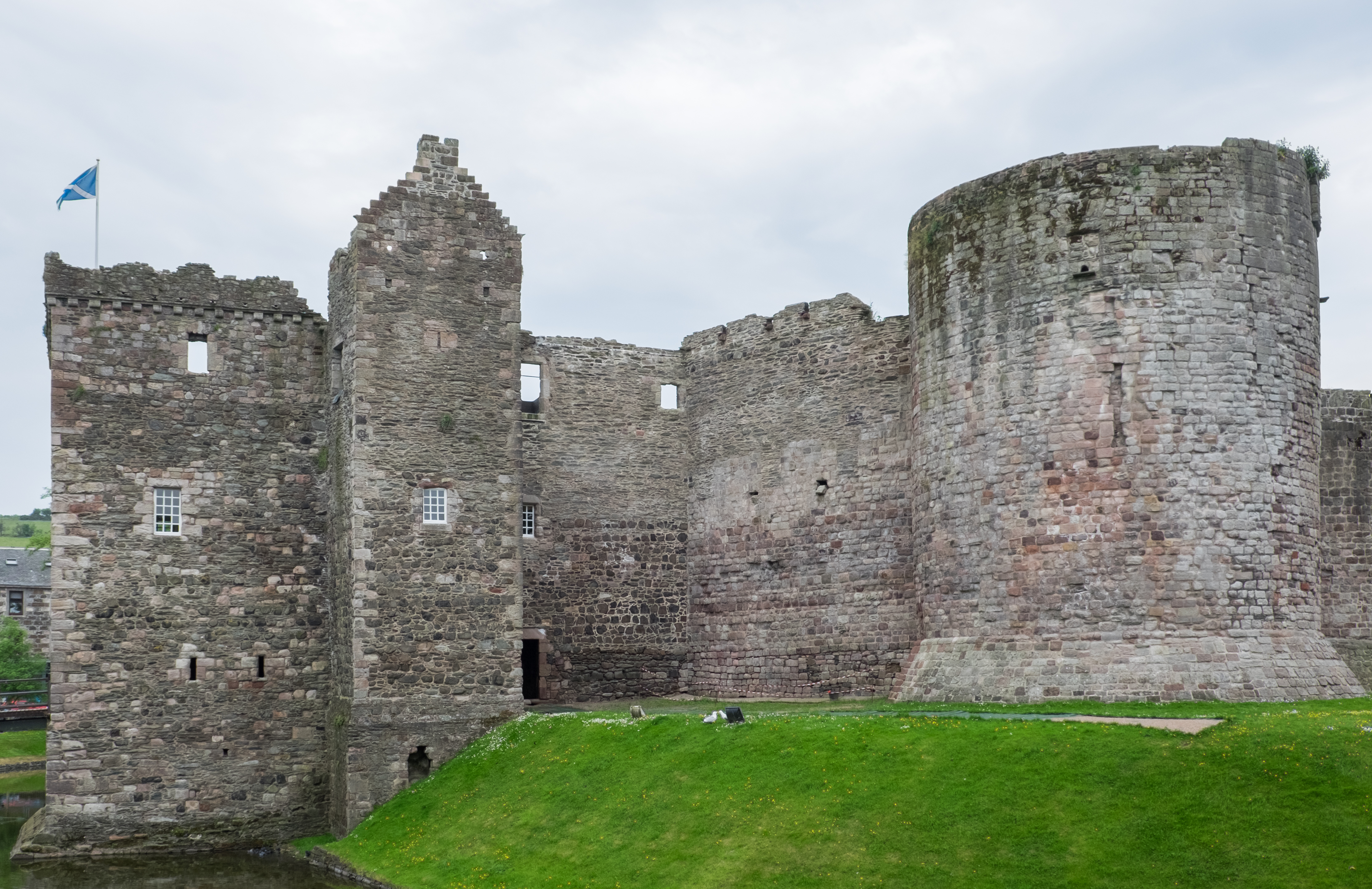
Rothesay Castle in 2016

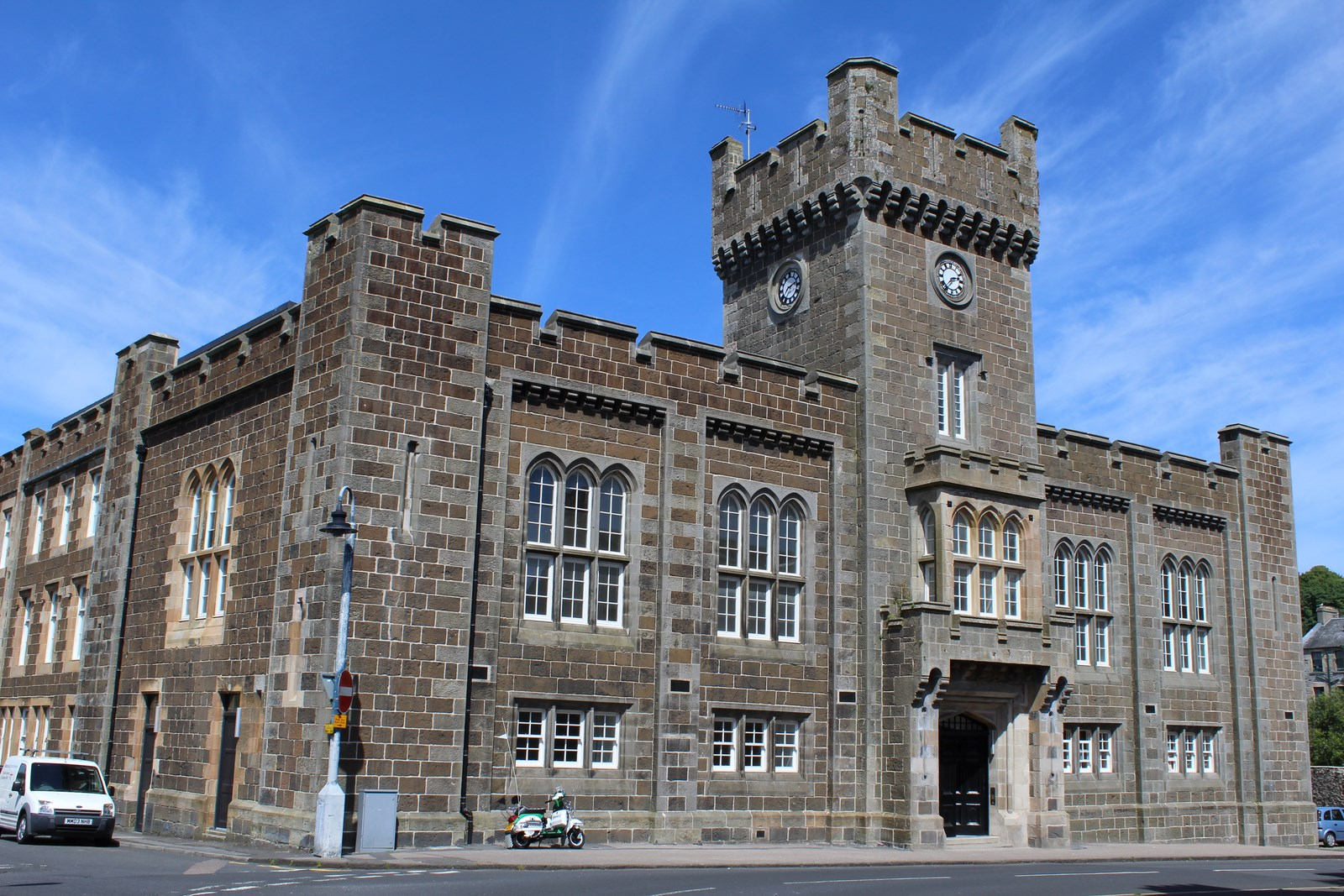
Rothesay Town Hall and County Buildings

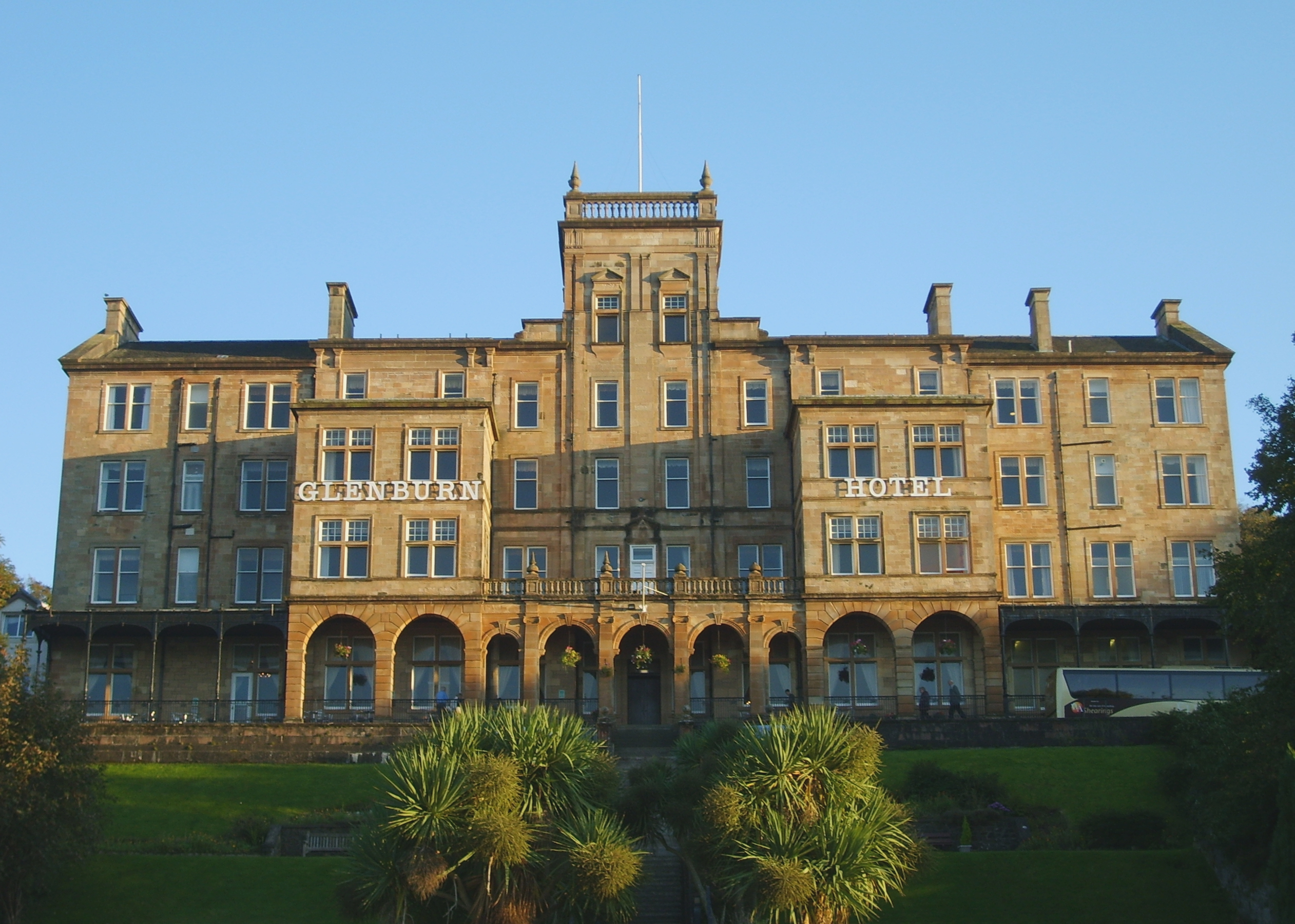
Glenburn Hotel, formerly a hydropathic establishment

The old town centred on Rothesay Castle, which was built in the 13th century. The castle has long stood in ruins, but it is nevertheless picturesque, and was a focal point for tourists as soon the town began developing into a seaside resort.

Rothesay was the county town in the civil parish of Rothesay, which was located in the former county of Bute. The county historically included the islands of Great Cumbrae, Little Cumbrae and Arran. Rothesay Town Hall and County Buildings overlook the castle.

During the Victorian era, Rothesay became a popular tourist destination. In particular, it was hugely popular with Glaswegians going "doon the watter" (literally “down the water” – a reference to the waters of the Firth of Clyde). Its wooden pier was busy with steamer traffic. It was home to one of Scotland's many hydropathic establishments, which were in vogue at the time. It also had an electric tramway, the Rothesay and Ettrick Bay Light Railway, which ran across the whole island of Bute and carried passengers to one of the island's largest beaches (the tramway closed in the mid-1930s).

A war memorial designed by Pilkington Jackson was erected in 1922. The Winter Gardens building, erected in 1923, was a centre of many activities in Rothesay in the mid-20th century, hosting some of the best-known music hall entertainers of the day. Opened in 1938, Rothesay Pavilion quickly became one of the town’s most prominent attractions. Designed by Ayr architect James Andrew Carrick, it is a notable example of International Modernist architecture. Although the building later fell into disrepair, it has remained a significant landmark on the seafront and is currently undergoing a comprehensive restoration programme.

During World War II, Rothesay Bay was the home port of HMS Cyclops, which was the depot ship for the 7th Submarine Flotilla and the training facility for virtually all the British submariners who served during the war. In 1941 and 1942, the Officer Concentration Station Rothesay was also located here.

By the 1960s, Rothesay's heyday as a tourist mecca had largely ended. Inexpensive foreign package holidays had become more popular with UK residents. The Winter Gardens building was closed and lay in disuse for decades. However, it was redeveloped in the 1990s, and is now open as a tourist information and exhibition centre.

=== Duke of Rothesay ===
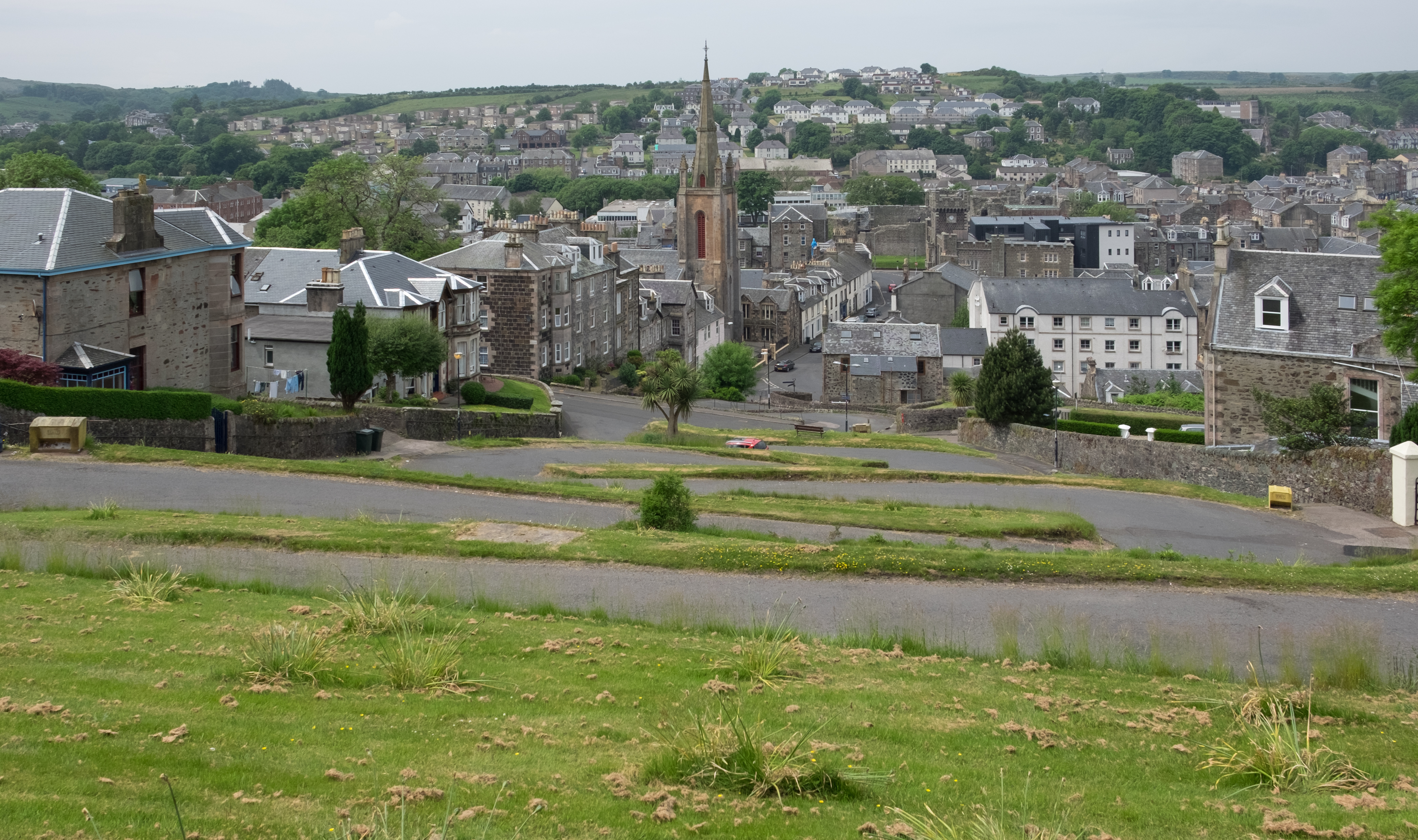
View of Rothesay from Serpentine Road

The heir to the British throne (currently William, Prince of Wales) is known in Scotland as the Duke of Rothesay. This practice was begun in the late 14th century by Robert III of Scotland, who regularly resided at Rothesay Castle, and first granted the title to his son David in 1398. At that time, the name Rothesay referred to the whole island of Bute, rather than to the town (which was known as Bute-town). The island of Bute (along with the island of Arran) was under the control of Robert III because he had inherited it from his Stewart ancestors. They had owned it ever since King Alexander III of Scotland (having received it from Norway under the Treaty of Perth of 1266) assigned it to Robert III's great-grandfather, Alexander Stewart. The two islands were privately owned by the Stewart family until Robert II (Alexander Stewart's grandson and Robert III's father) inherited the throne from his mother, after which the islands became the property of the Crown.

Once Robert III had conferred this title on his son, the title continued to be given to every heir of the Scottish throne thereafter. Following the Union of the Crowns in 1603, the heir to the British throne was always also formally considered “heir to the Scottish throne” and so acquired the title.

Unlike the title's English equivalent (Duke of Cornwall), the title Duke of Rothesay does not come with any land attached to it in the form of a Duchy. That is because control of the land was instead given to Robert III's half-brother and to the latter's descendants, who acquired the title Marquess of Bute in the 18th century. The current marquess remains the main landlord of the island; his principal seat, Mount Stuart, lies a few miles to the south of Rothesay Castle.

=== Modern times ===
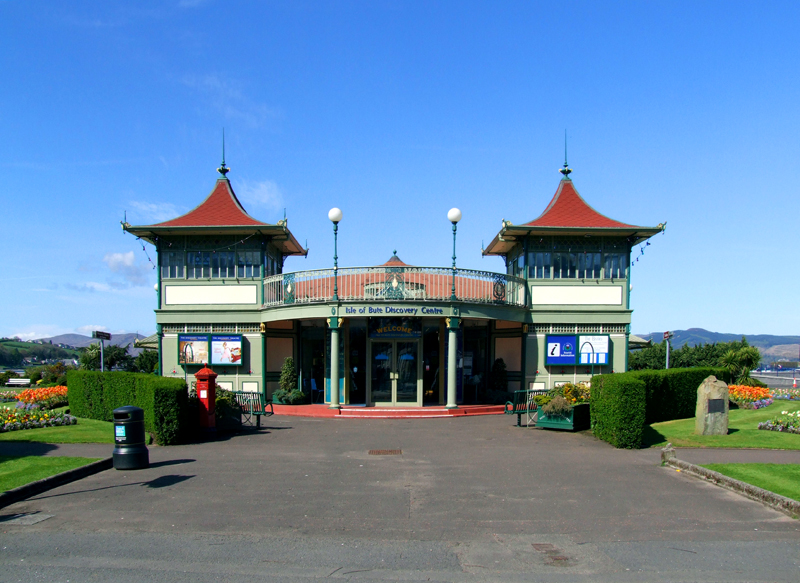
Rothesay Winter Gardens

Rothesay was granted a multimillion-pound harbour development project just in time for the arrival of the next generation of lower-firth ferries MV Argyle and MV Bute.

In August 2018, the Donald Campbell Bluebird hydroplane held trials on Loch Fad. It was the first time the vehicle had been in the water since it was recovered from Coniston Water in the Lake District and restored after the 1967 accident in which Campbell was killed.

== Culture ==
Rothesay has hosted the National Mòd twice: in 1908 and 1952.

=== Sport ===
The most successful sporting club on the island is the Bute Shinty Club, which has competed at the highest level of the sport (the Marine Harvest Premier League). The Bute club was promoted to the Premier League in 2006 by winning the South Division One competition. It is also a multiple-time winner of the Balliemore Cup.

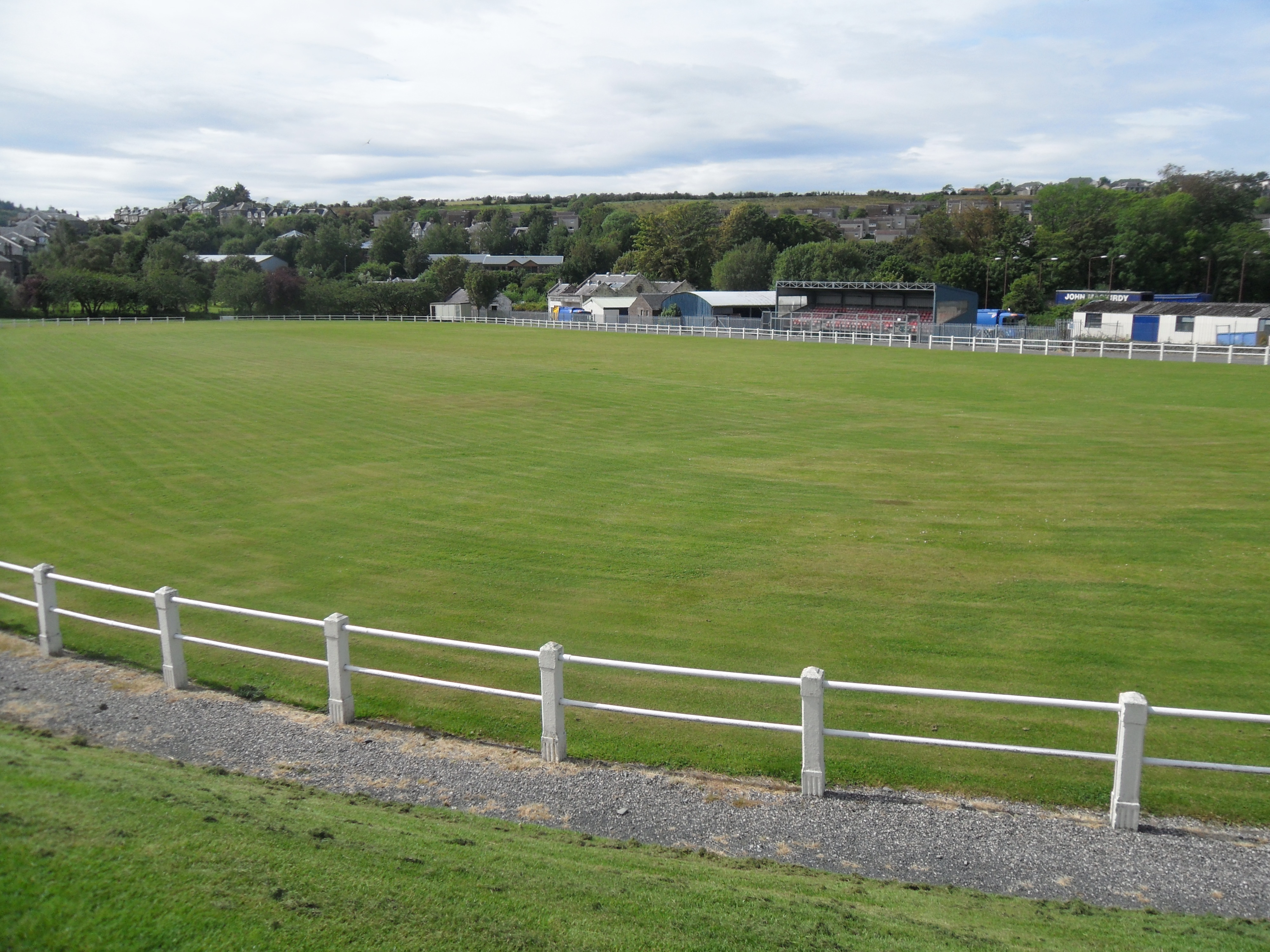
The Stadium, High Street, home of Rothesay Brandane AFC and location for the local Highland Games

The town has an amateur football club, Rothesay Brandane A.F.C. (nicknamed "The Danes".) It was founded in 1946. They played in the Scottish Amateur Football League starting in 1947, reached the semi-final of the Scottish Amateur Cup in 1948–49, and won the league in both the 1963–64 and 2000–01 seasons. In 2004, they transferred into the Caledonian Amateur Football League Division 2, and, having won promotion after the 2007–08 season, they currently play in Division 1. They also had a youth team for ages 15 and under, called the Rothesay Brandane Rovers. (In the 19th century, the town had a different football club called the Bute Rangers F.C., which competed for the Scottish Cup.)

The Bute County Cricket Club plays in the Western District Cricket Union Championship.

The island has three golf courses: the 18-hole Rothesay Golf Club is on the outskirts of the town; the 9-hole Bute Golf Course is near the sands of Stravannan Bay on the west coast of the island; and the 13-hole Port Bannatyne Golf Club sits on the hills behind the town. There are also two putting greens on the town's seafront.

The town hosts the High School of Glasgow rugby camp every summer.

For bowling enthusiasts, Bute boasts four greens: Ardbeg, Craigmore, Kingarth and Rothesay. The oldest of them, Rothesay Bowling Club, was established in the 1860s.

The Bute Bowling Association runs many local club competitions. It also runs an open tournament each August, in which both ladies and gentlemen may compete; as of 2014, that tournament was in its 57th year.

=== Education ===
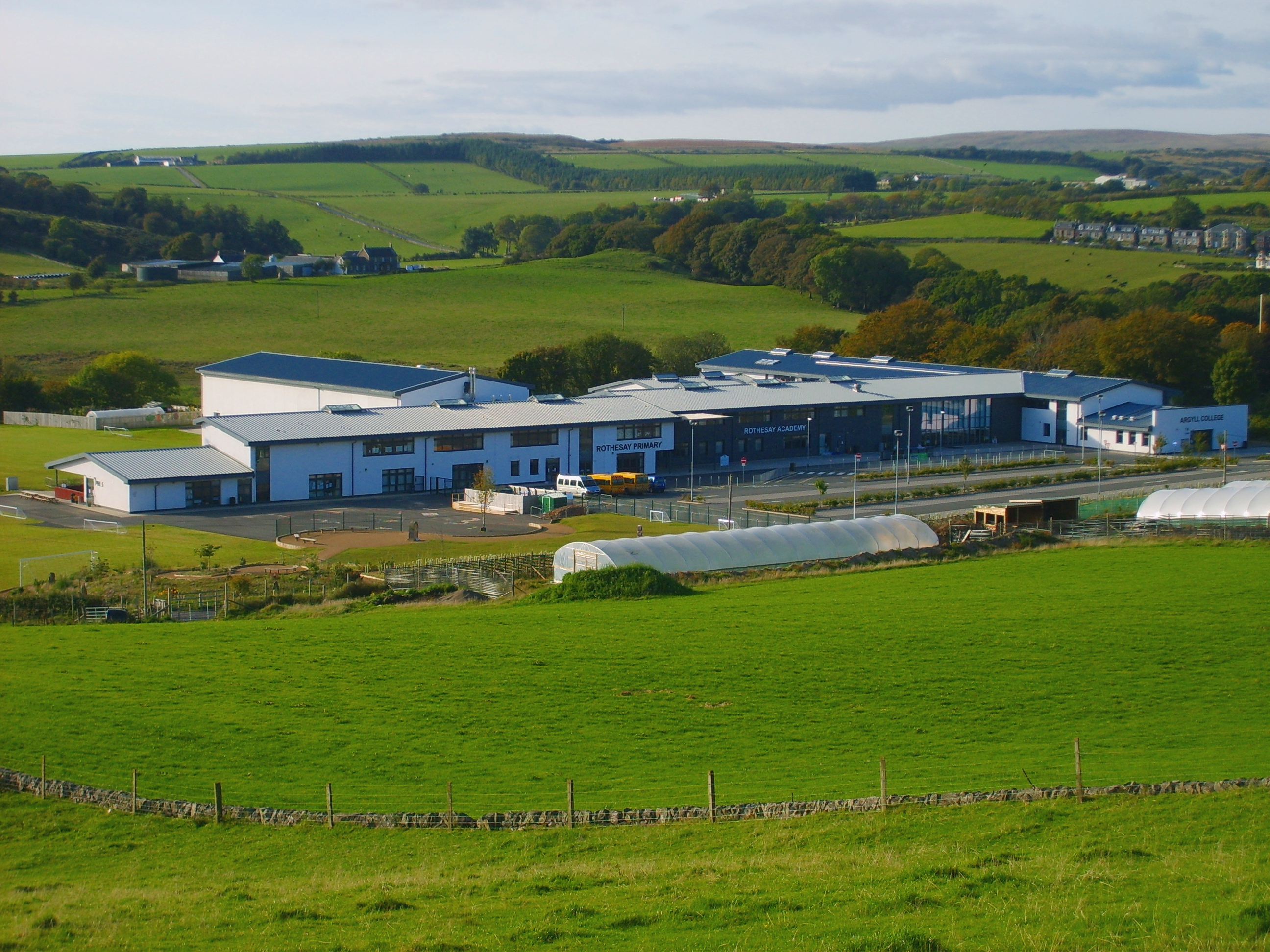
Rothesay Joint Campus

Rothesay currently has three primary schools: St Andrews Primary School, Rothesay Primary School, and North Bute Primary School. It has one secondary school, Rothesay Academy. In 2007, a Rothesay Primary and Rothesay Academy formed a joint campus school, and the building that previously housed Rothesay Academy was closed.

== Notable people ==
- Professor Eleanor Campbell: scientist (physical chemistry)
- Nathanael Chalmers: explorer
- Johnny Dumfries: former Formula One racing driver and Marquess of Bute
- Andrew Blain Baird : Aviation pioneer
- Thomas Gillies: New Zealand lawyer, judge and politician
- Angela Haggerty: journalist and social commentator
- George Leslie: colourist painter
- Ian Jenkins: politician
- Ashley Lilley: actor (Ali in Mamma Mia)
- Sir William Macewen: pioneer in brain surgery
- Sheina Marshall: zoologist
- Troy Kennedy Martin: writer of Z-Cars
- Jim McAlister: footballer (Greenock Morton F.C., Dundee F.C. and Blackpool F.C.)
- John McIndoe: printer
- Billy McIsaac: keyboardist for Slik, PVC2, and the Zones
- Peter Monie: civil servant
- Jane Ross: Scottish international footballer; reserve forward for Team GB's squad at the London 2012 Olympic Games
- Professor Martin Smellie (1927-1988): biochemist
- Archie Stevenson: American politician
- John Tiffin Stewart: civil engineer
- Matthew Stewart: mathematician
- John Stuart, 3rd Earl of Bute: First Scottish Prime Minister of Great Britain (buried in St Mary's Chapel, Rothesay).
- John McLean Thompson: botanist
- Sir Graham Watson: Liberal Democrat politician; member of the European Parliament
- Lena Zavaroni: singer; child star
- Norman Schofield: political scientist

== Climate ==
Like the rest of Scotland — and the British Isles in general - Rothesay has a maritime climate, with cool summers and mild winters. Because of its island location, the risk of severe frost is mitigated by the surrounding waters. Temperatures can range from as high as 28.5 °C (83.3 °F) (recorded in August 1975), to as low as −8.4 °C (16.9 °F) (recorded in January 1982).

Climate data for Rothesay (43 m or 141 ft asl, averages 1991–2020, extremes 1960–present)
Month	Jan	Feb	Mar	Apr	May	Jun	Jul	Aug	Sep	Oct	Nov	Dec	Year
Record high °C (°F)	14.0 (57.2)	14.6 (58.3)	16.6 (61.9)	22.6 (72.7)	25.5 (77.9)	28.1 (82.6)	28.0 (82.4)	28.5 (83.3)	25.0 (77.0)	21.0 (69.8)	16.8 (62.2)	14.4 (57.9)	28.5 (83.3)
Mean daily maximum °C (°F)	7.5 (45.5)	7.8 (46.0)	9.4 (48.9)	12.0 (53.6)	15.0 (59.0)	17.2 (63.0)	18.7 (65.7)	18.4 (65.1)	16.3 (61.3)	12.9 (55.2)	9.8 (49.6)	7.8 (46.0)	12.7 (54.9)
Mean daily minimum °C (°F)	2.7 (36.9)	2.6 (36.7)	3.3 (37.9)	4.8 (40.6)	7.1 (44.8)	9.7 (49.5)	11.5 (52.7)	11.5 (52.7)	9.9 (49.8)	7.2 (45.0)	4.9 (40.8)	3.0 (37.4)	6.5 (43.7)
Record low °C (°F)	−8.4 (16.9)	−5.6 (21.9)	−4.5 (23.9)	−4.4 (24.1)	−1.6 (29.1)	2.0 (35.6)	3.9 (39.0)	4.4 (39.9)	1.0 (33.8)	−1.9 (28.6)	−2.5 (27.5)	−5 (23)	−8.4 (16.9)
Average rainfall mm (inches)	165.7 (6.52)	127.2 (5.01)	118.9 (4.68)	86.5 (3.41)	78.6 (3.09)	90.2 (3.55)	107.5 (4.23)	124.0 (4.88)	117.3 (4.62)	163.3 (6.43)	159.1 (6.26)	160.3 (6.31)	1,498.6 (58.99)
Average rainy days (≥ 1 mm)	19.7	16.9	16.2	13.5	12.5	13.4	14.7	15.3	15.5	18.3	19.4	18.8	194.2
Mean monthly sunshine hours	41.0	67.7	101.8	151.5	200.9	172.2	156.2	154.8	116.1	81.0	53.7	35.8	1,332.7
Source 1: Met Office
Source 2: Royal Dutch Meteorological Institute/KNMI

== Gallery ==
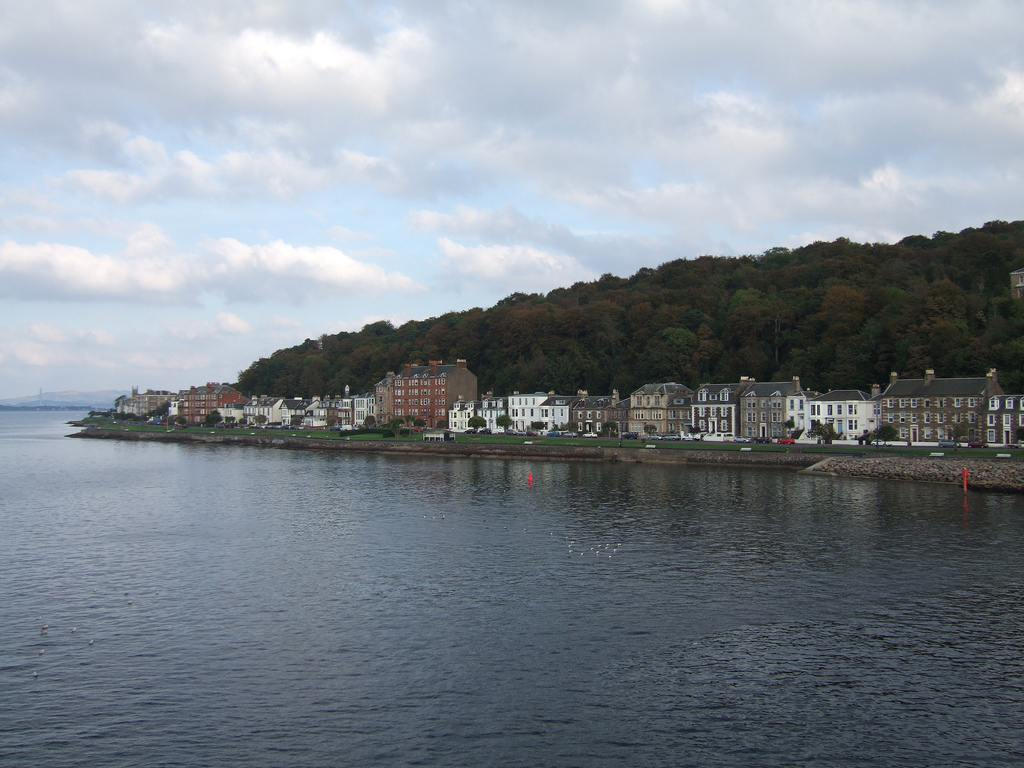
Rothesay

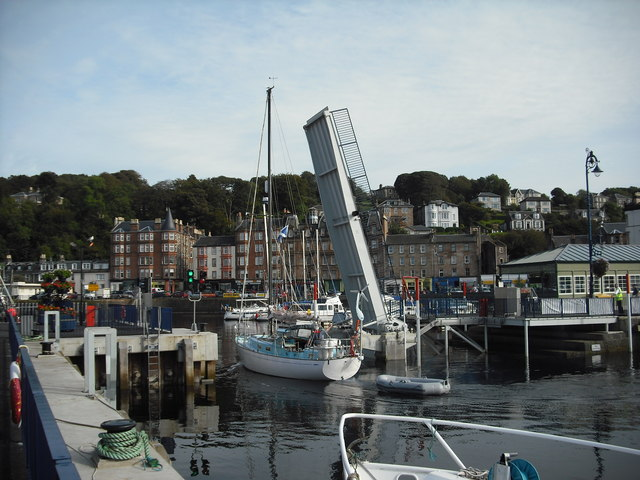
Rothesay harbour

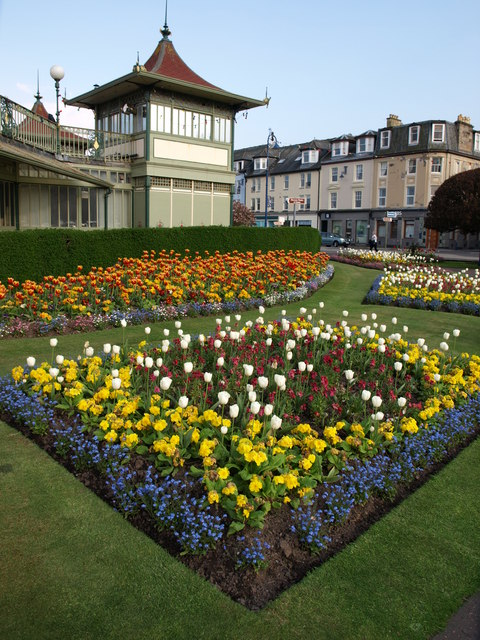
Rothesay gardens

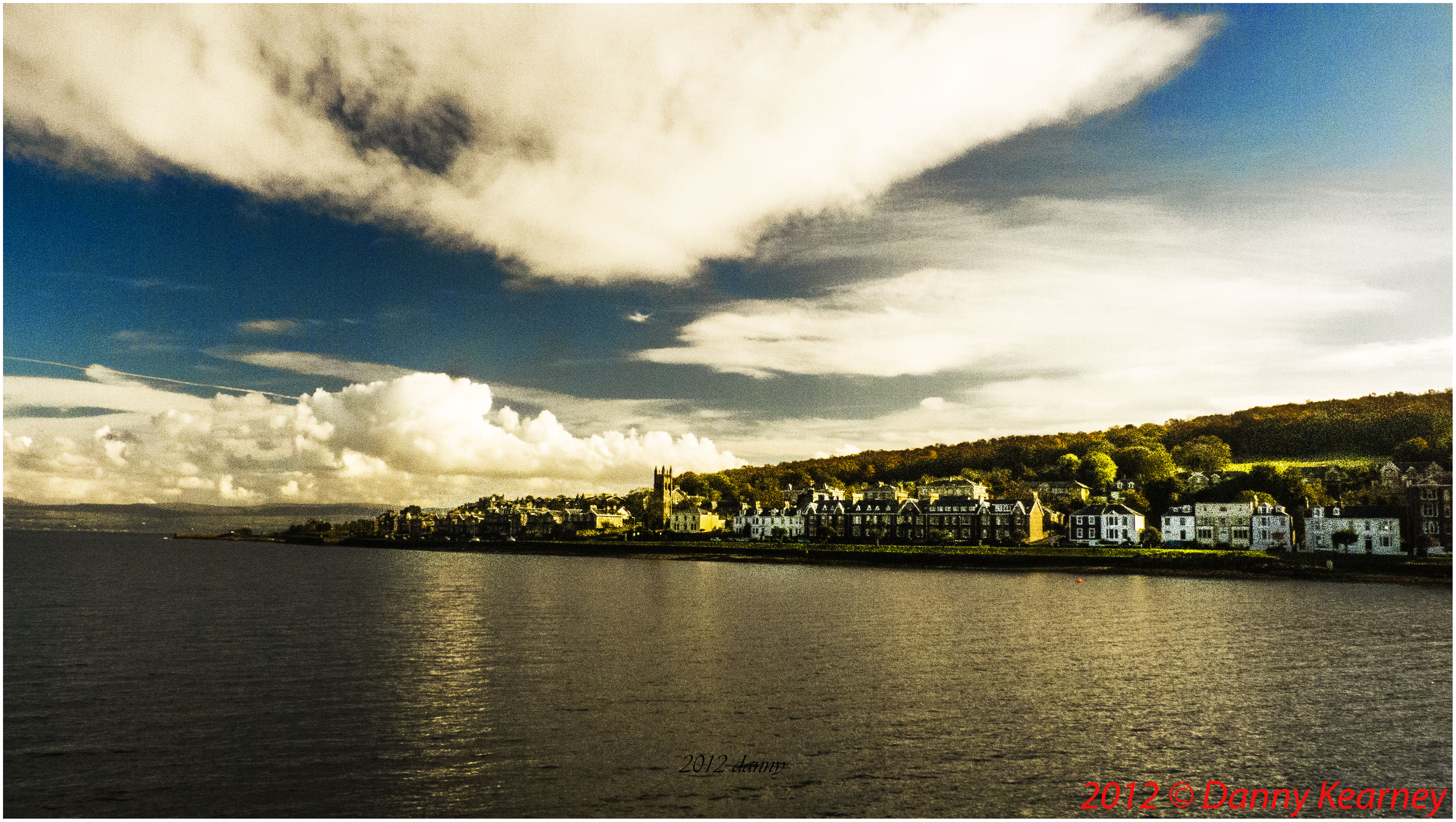
Rothesay Isle Of Bute - panoramio

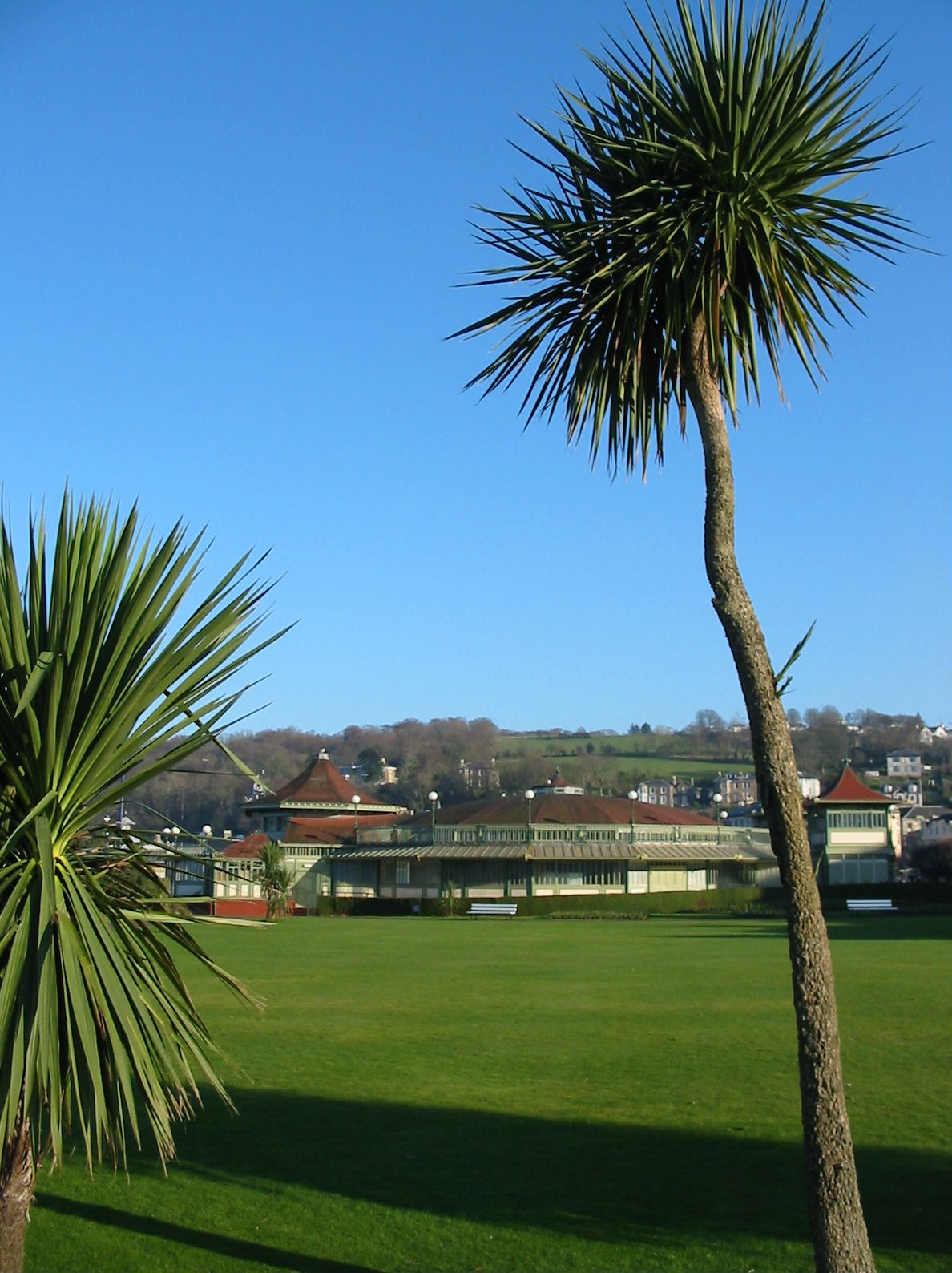
The sea front at Rothesay
