= County-City Building (South Bend) =

Office building in Indiana, U.S.

Coordinates: 41°40′31″N 86°15′10.5″W

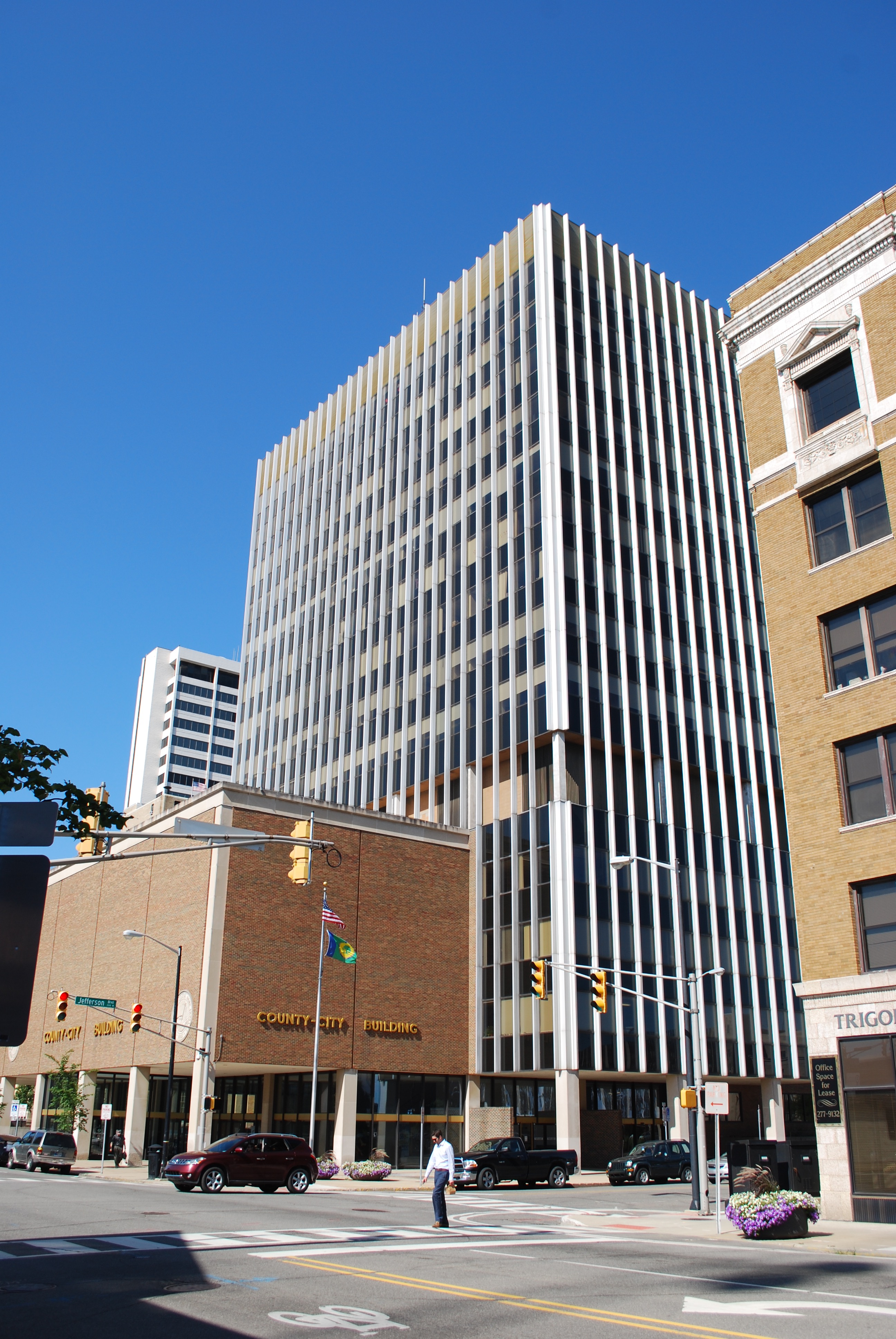
- Interactive map of the County-City Building area
- Alternative names: City Hall

General information
- Status: Completed
- Type: Government
- Location: 227 W Jefferson Blvd, South Bend, Indiana
- Opening: 1971
- Cost: $3.7 million USD

Height
- Roof: 196 ft (60 m)

Technical details
- Floor count: 15

Design and construction
- Architects: Mathews, Purucker & Associates and Toth & Toth

The County-City Building is a high-rise in downtown South Bend, Indiana. It houses the offices of the County Health Department, Council, and Board of Commissioners, as well as the South Bend Mayor's Office, City Clerk's Office, and City Council chambers.

== Construction and design ==
Built in 1971, the building features an International style of architecture with tinted windows and silver columns running the height of the tower.

== Tenants ==
The building is currently occupied by the offices of St. Joseph County and the City of South Bend.

=== Voting ===
The building hosts a polling location for school board, city, county, state, and federal elections.

=== Clinic ===
After waning demand for the COVID-19 vaccine, all county-wide vaccination operations were moved to the lobby of the building. Tickets to Notre Dame football home games are being offered as an incentive to get the shot.

== Location ==
Within downtown, it is adjacent it the Farmers Security Bank building, which is a historic landmark, the Second St. Joseph County Courthouse, and the Third St. Joseph County Courthouse.
