= List of listed buildings in Colonsay And Oronsay, Argyll and Bute =

This is a list of listed buildings in the parish of Colonsay and Oronsay in Argyll and Bute, Scotland.

== List ==
Name	Location	Date Listed	Grid Ref. (Note: Sometimes known as OSGB36, the grid reference (where provided) is based on the British national grid reference system used by the Ordnance Survey. • "Guide to National Grid". Ordnance Survey. • "Get-a-map". Ordnance Survey.)	Geo-coordinates	Notes	LB Number (Note: Historic Environment Scotland assign a unique alphanumeric identifier to each designated site in Scotland, for listed buildings this always begins with "LB", for example "LB12345".)	Image
Scalasaig Farm-House, Scalasaig				56°04′09″N 6°12′04″W	Category B	4913	Upload Photo
Colonsay Hotel, Scalasaig				56°04′08″N 6°11′47″W	Category B	4911	Upload another image See more images
Lord Colonsay Monument				56°03′55″N 6°11′38″W	Category C(S)	4914	Upload Photo
Colonsay And Oronsay Parish Church, Scalasaig				56°04′06″N 6°11′44″W	Category B	4910	Upload another image See more images
South Entrance To Steading, Kiloran Home Farm				56°05′27″N 6°11′42″W	Category C(S)	5084	Upload Photo
Oronsay Small Cross				56°01′12″N 6°15′15″W	Category B	5088	Upload Photo
Colonsay House, Kiloran				56°05′34″N 6°11′23″W	Category B	5082	Upload another image See more images
Sundial Beside Colonsay House				56°05′33″N 6°11′25″W	Category C(S)	5083	Upload Photo
Oronsay Priory				56°01′12″N 6°15′17″W	Category A	5086	Upload another image See more images
Oronsay House				56°01′10″N 6°15′19″W	Category B	5089	Upload Photo
Scalasaig Harbour, Port Na Feamainn				56°04′07″N 6°11′12″W	Category C(S)	5081	Upload Photo
St. Catan's Chapel Kilchattan Burial Ground. Lower Kilchattan				56°04′30″N 6°14′22″W	Category C(S)	5085	Upload Photo
Scalasaig, Smiddy Cottage				56°04′07″N 6°11′52″W	Category B	4912	Upload Photo

== Key ==
The scheme for classifying buildings in Scotland is:

- Category A: "buildings of national or international importance, either architectural or historic; or fine, little-altered examples of some particular period, style or building type."
- Category B: "buildings of regional or more than local importance; or major examples of some particular period, style or building type, which may have been altered."
- Category C: "buildings of local importance; lesser examples of any period, style, or building type, as originally constructed or moderately altered; and simple traditional buildings which group well with other listed buildings."

In March 2016 there were 47,288 listed buildings in Scotland. Of these, 8% were Category A, and 50% were Category B, with the remaining 42% being Category C.

== See also ==
- List of listed buildings in Argyll and Bute
