= William Galloway (architectural historian) =

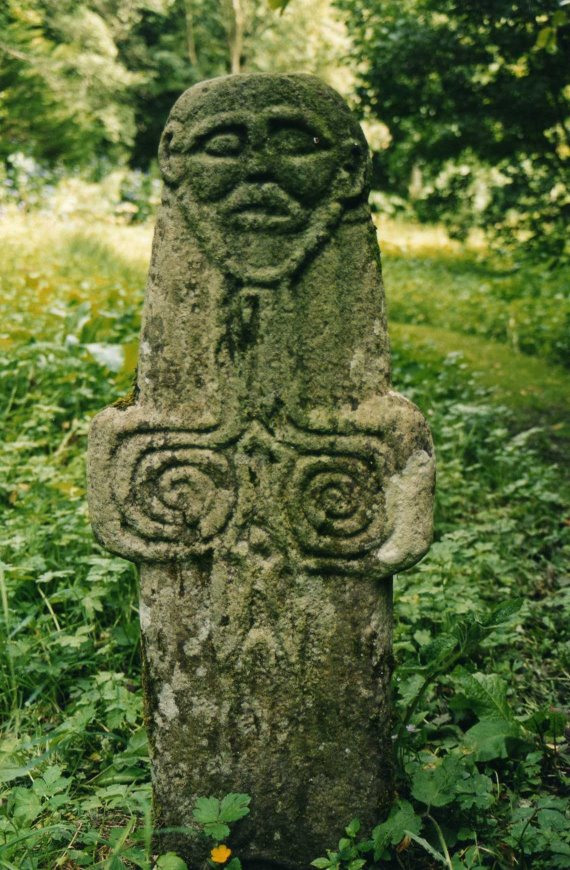
Riasg Buidhe Cross in the gardens of Colonsay House

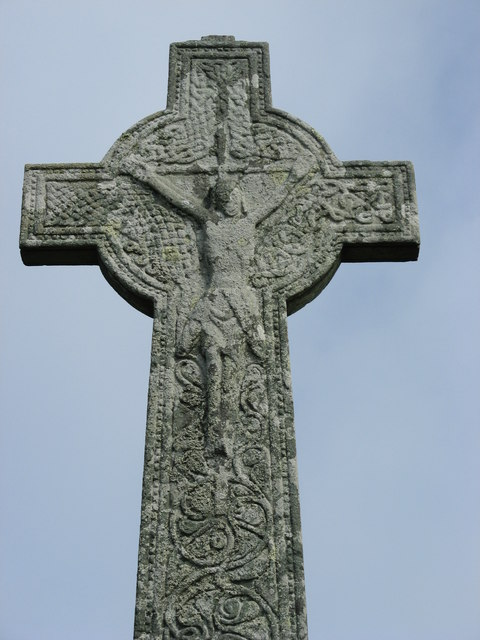
The High Cross at Oronsay

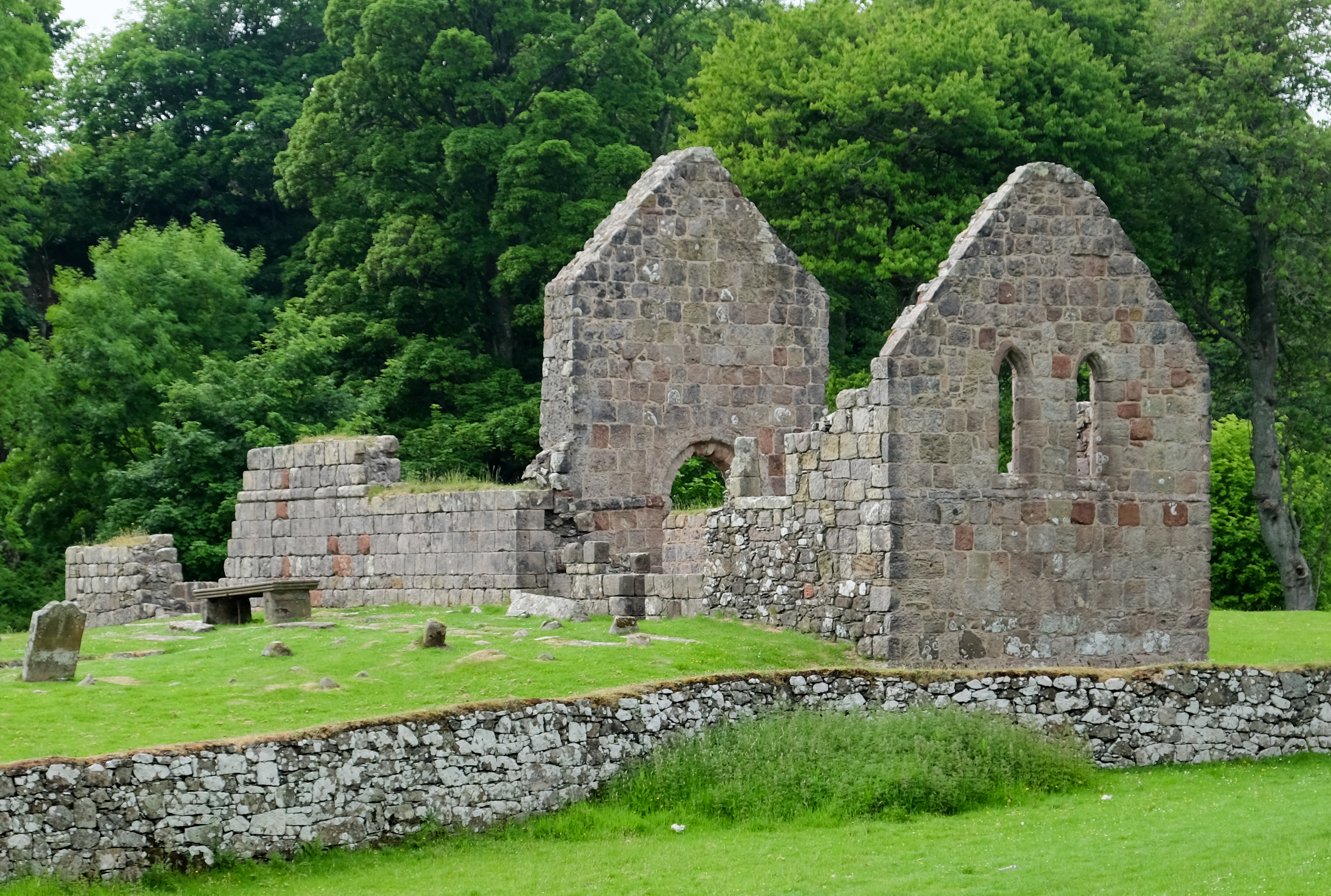
St Blane's Church

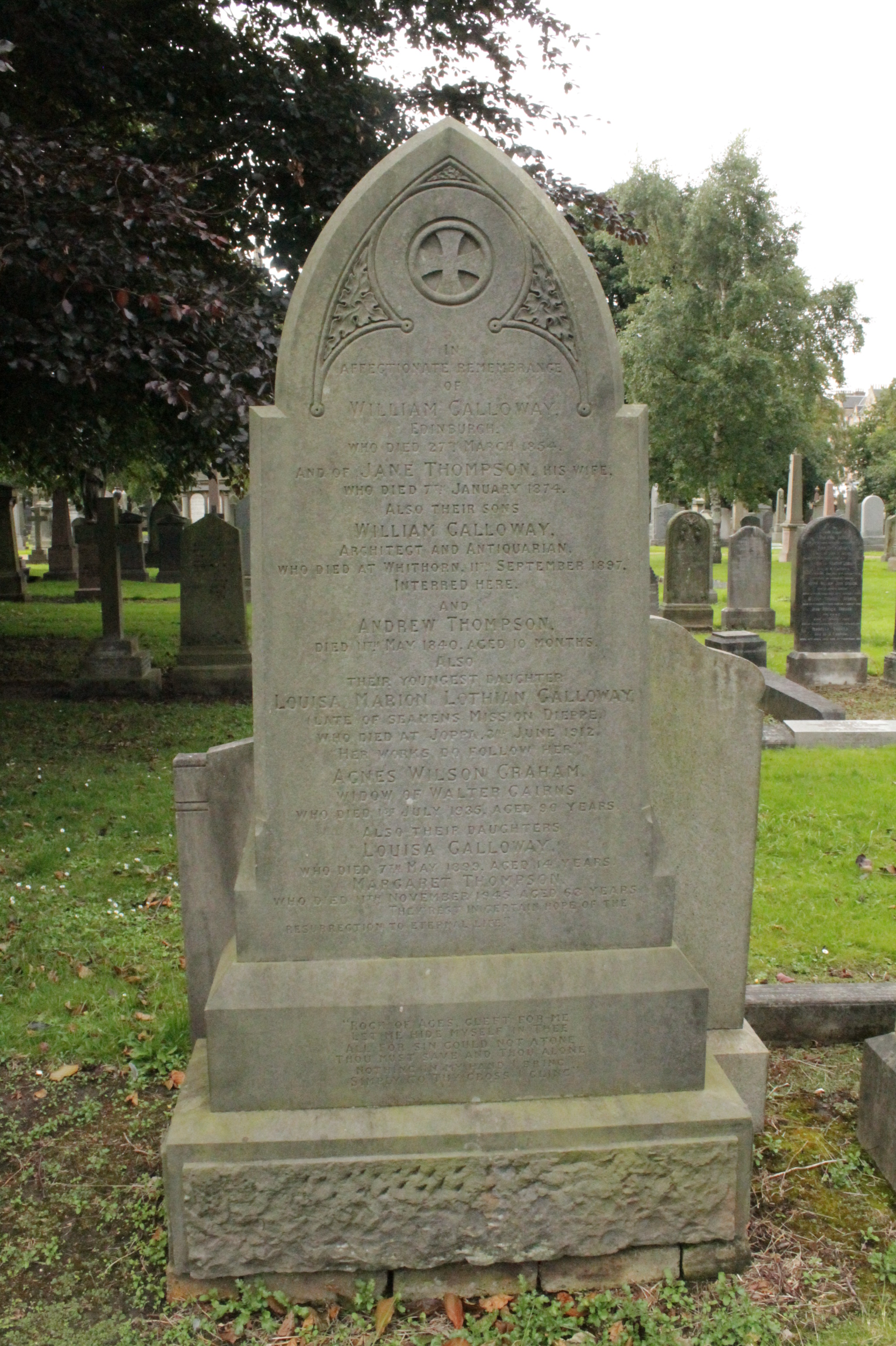
The grave of William Galloway, Grange Cemetery

William Galloway (1830–1897) was a 19th-century architect and builder in Edinburgh, mainly remembered as an architectural historian. He also worked as an architectural illustrator and photographer.

In authorship he used the title William de B M Galloway but this appears an affectation.

He was an expert on, and early cataloguer of, Pictish stones.

== Life ==
He was born in Edinburgh (or Leith) the son of William Galloway and Jane Thompson.

He was educated at Edinburgh High School on Calton Hill then articled as an architect, training under Patrick Wilson from 1844 to 1849.

In 1868 he was doing archaeological investigation at Canons Ashby. In 1869 he was asked to rescue, record and catalogue the Pictish stones at Meigle (now forming the Meigle Sculptured Stone Museum).

From 1871 he began an extensive studying and record of St Blane's Church at Kingarth. In the same year he published lithograph drawings of St Magnus Cathedral on Orkney.

In the 1870s he was living in the home of his mother at 24 Gardeners Crescent and it seems very likely he built parts of this Crescent and owned property there.

In 1875 he joined Sir Malcolm McNeill on an archaeological dig on Colonsay. He lived with McNeill at Colonsay House for some time and may have been involved in the relocation of the Riasg Buidhe Cross to the garden there. He returned to Colonsay many times, presumably carrying out research for his book, The Battle of Tofrek ... under Major Gen. Sir John C. McNeil VC, KCB (Edinburgh 1888) and in 1882/3 excavated a Viking burial site at Kiloran Bay with Sir Malcolm.

On 10 May 1883 he gave a lecture on the Iona Pictish crosses to the Society of Antiquaries in London.

In the summer of 1883 he was commissioned to excavate and record Oronsay Priory. He erected the High Cross and did much restoration and consolidation work.

Also in 1883 he excavated at Restenneth Priory with Dr John Stuart and also recorded the Corsehope Rings in Midlothian. During this period he lived at Midfield in Inveresk. He presented many papers on these discoveries to the Society of Antiquaries of Scotland from 1875 onwards. He was elected a Member of this society in 1877.

From 1885 his primary patron was John Crichton-Stuart, 3rd Marquess of Bute. The Marquess financed Galloway's excavation of Whithorn Cathedral 1886/7. Galloway is thought to have moved permanently to Whithorn, living at 87 George Street but the Valuation rolls for 1885-8 suggest he was neither a proprietor nor a tenant there. In 1889 the Marquess further commissioned Galloway to excavate and record Cruggleton church, Kirkmadrine church and the Well of Rees at Kilgallioch. During this same period he assisted the architects MacGibbon & Ross in their survey of traditional architecture in south-west Scotland. In this exercise he provided surveys of St Blanes Church, Barr Castle, Castle Semple Church, Kilwinning Abbey, St Johns Church in Dalry, Castle Stuart, Castle Wigg, Ardwell, Carscreuch, Garlies, Killasser, Myrton Castle, Penninghame Castle and Portpatrick church.

William died in Whithorn on 11 September 1897 at 87 George Street of diabetes. He was presumably being cared for by the proprietor, Agnes Anderson widow of Thomas Anderson marine engineer. His body was taken to Edinburgh for burial and he lies in Grange Cemetery with his parents. The stone lies near the centre of the north-east section. Although some records state that he is interred at Whithorn the gravestone in the Grange specifically states "interred here".

As he was unmarried his sister, J M Galloway, inherited his estate. She sold his artefacts, photographic plates and rubbings (of Pictish stones) to the Society of Antiquaries.

== Works ==
- Notes on Cladh Bhile Burial Ground (1878)
- Sir John Carstairs McNeill and the Battle of Tofrek (1885)
- The Two Auld Whinstones (poem)
- The Sculptured Stones of Logierait Churchyard (1878)
- The Battle of Tofrek ... under Major Gen. Sir John C. McNeil VC, KCB (Edinburgh 1888)
- St Ninian and the Christianisation of Scotland (1890)
- Report on Restenneth Priory (1890)
