= Chapel of St. Oran, Colonsay =

Chapel on Colonsay, Argyll and Bute, Scotland

Coordinates: 56.09262°N 6.18996°W

The Chapel of St. Oran (Scottish Gaelic: Cill Oran), was a chapel dedicated to Saint Oran at Kiloran located on the Inner Hebridean island of Colonsay, Scotland. It was located at grid reference NR39489678.

A chapel, potentially rebuilt was noticed at the site in 1695. The ruins of the chapel were incorporated into Colonsay House which was built in 1722. A well, known as Tobar Oran (English: The well of St. Oran), is located 90 metres east of Colonsay House.

The chapel had a barn located nearby, which according to tradition was part of a monastic abbey, and was known as Sabhal Bàn (English: White Barn).
