= St Cathan's Chapel =

Ruins in Scotland

Coordinates: 56.075096°N 6.239381°W

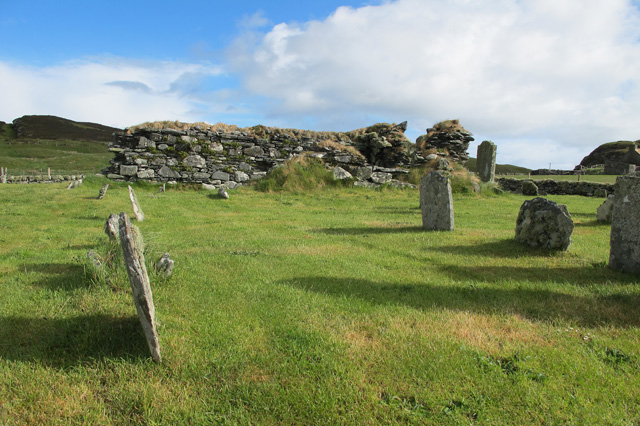

St Cathan's Chapel (Scottish Gaelic: Cill Chatan) is a ruined chapel on the island of Colonsay, Scotland in the Inner Hebrides. It was dedicated to Cathan, an obscure saint once venerated across the western Scottish islands. It is located at grid reference NR3629095026, in the settlement of Lower Kilchattan.

The ruins, which date to the pre-Reformation period, perhaps to the 14th century, stand within a walled graveyard which is still used. The structure was built on the site of an even earlier chapel, no trace of which survives. A holy well, known as Tobar Chatten (English: Well of Cathan), is located nearby at grid reference NR364948. An object thought to be the chapel's holy water font was found and moved to Scalasaig, where it is now used as a baptismal font in the local parish church.
