= Chapel of St. Mary, Colonsay =

Chapel in Argyll and Bute, Scotland

Coordinates: 56°4′57.75″N 6°13′0.76″W

The Chapel of St. Mary (Scottish Gaelic: Cill Mhoire), was a chapel dedicated to Saint Mary at Upper Kilchattan located on the Inner Hebridean island of Colonsay, Scotland. It was located at grid reference NR37749578.

According to tradition it was built by the monks of Iona. The chapel is now in ruins.
