= Colonsay Hotel =

Historic building in Scotland

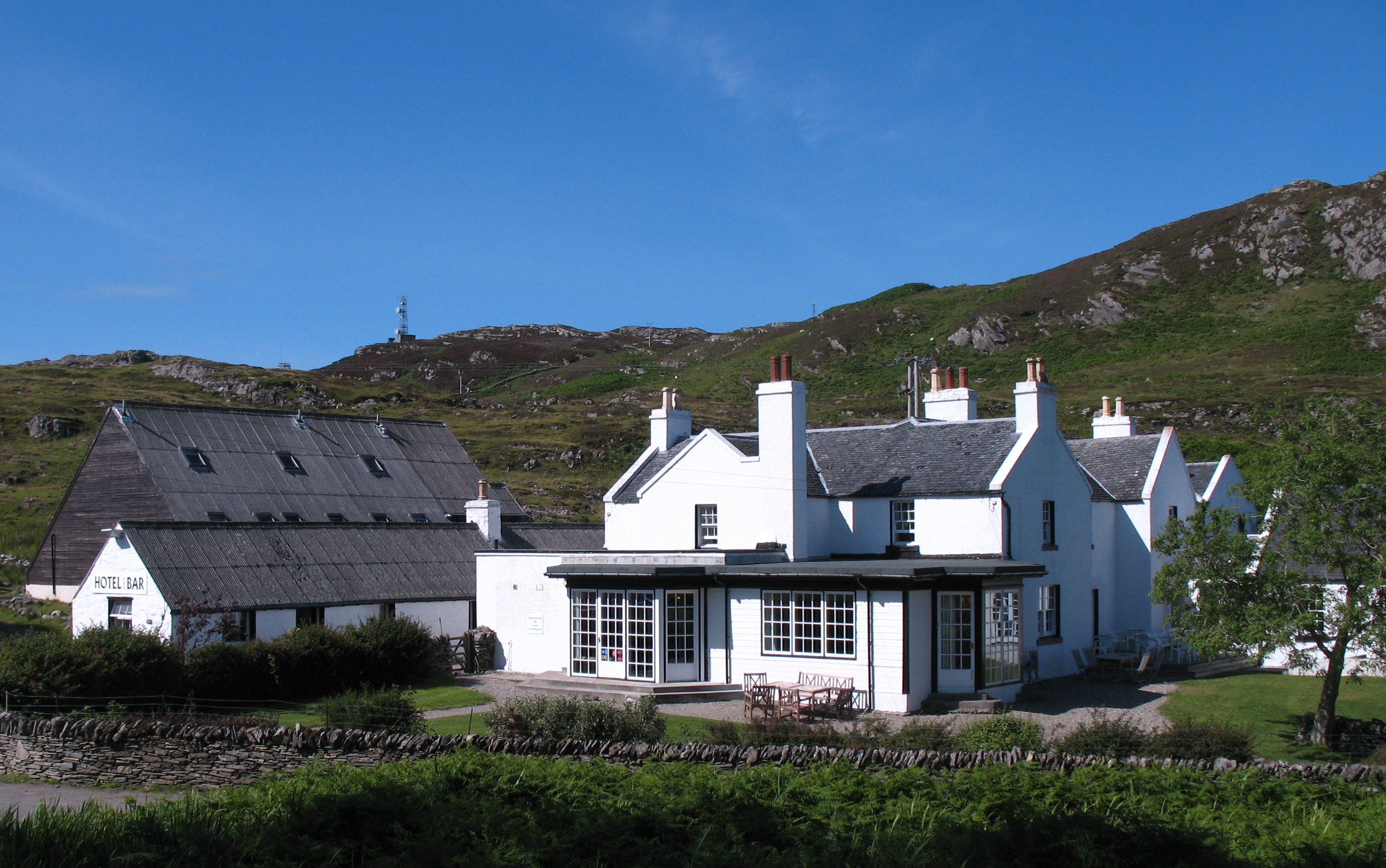
- Colonsay Hotel
- Interactive map of the Colonsay Hotel area
- Former names: Colonsay Inn

General information
- Location: Scalasaig, Colonsay, Scotland
- Coordinates: 56°04′08″N 6°11′47″W
- Construction started: 1750

Listed Building – Category B
- Designated: 20 July 1971
- Reference no.: LB4911

Colonsay Hotel is a Category B listed building in Scalasaig, Colonsay in the county of Argyll, in western Scotland.

== History and architecture ==
The building dates from c. 1750 but was later extended around 1804 by Michael Carmichael. It was later extended again in 1890. The chalet block was added in 1987 by the architect John Fox of Edinburgh.

Formerly known as the Colonsay Inn, it became the Colonsay Hotel in the mid-1880s when the proprietor was Donald McNeill.

From the mid 1978 to 1998 the hotel was run by Kevin and Christa Byrne and in 1988 received three merit awards from the Automobile Association.

In 2005 it was brought back into the Colonsay Estate by Alex and Jane Howard and then in 2021 it was put up for sale at an asking price of £650,000.
