= Riasg Buidhe Cross =

Cross in Colonsay, Scotland

Coordinates: 56.0930°N 6.1882°W

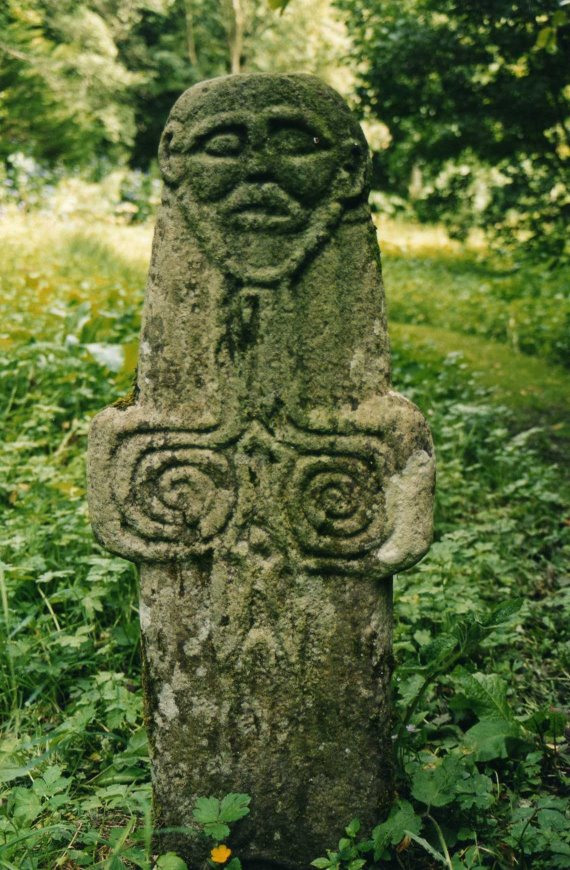
Riasg Buidhe Cross in the gardens of Colonsay House

The Riasg Buidhe Cross is a cross standing in the gardens of Colonsay House on the Inner Hebridean island of Colonsay, Scotland. It takes its name from the now abandoned and ruined village of Riasg Buidhe, about 1 1/2 miles (2.5 kilometres) southeast of Colonsay House, where it was found in the nineteenth century.

== History ==
Dating from the 7th or 8th century, the cross stood at Riasg Buidhe in what was recorded as an old burial ground until 1870, when it was taken to Colonsay House close to Kiloran (Scottish Gaelic: Cill Odhráin) which was built in 1722. The cross was placed beside Tobar Oran (English: The well of St. Oran) and in the vicinity of the now lost Chapel of St. Oran.

One side of the cross shows a solemn face with distinctive eyebrows and ears, below which extends a long thin neck. The arms of the figure - presumably Christ - are represented by two opposite spirals, and the lower part of the body ends in a fishtail, perhaps referring to the ancient Christian tradition of representing Christ as a fish.

The other side of the cross may be intended to represent a penis, as some have suggested.
