= Dùn Cholla =

Coordinates: 56.04454°N 6.21232°W

Dùn Cholla is a hill fort located on the Inner Hebridean island of Colonsay, Scotland. The site is located at grid reference NR37759150.

According to tradition it was a fort of Colla Uais after being exiled from Ireland in 310. St. Columba established his first church in Scotland in the shadow of Dùn Cholla.
