= Dùn Meadhonach =

Coordinates: 56.07197°N 6.2359°W

Dùn Meadhonach (English: Middle Fort) is a hillfort located on the Inner Hebridean island of Colonsay, Scotland. The site is located at grid reference NR36509472.

The fort overlooks Port Mòr and the village of Lower Kilchattan.
