= Colonsay Parish Church, Scalasaig =

Colonsay Parish Church
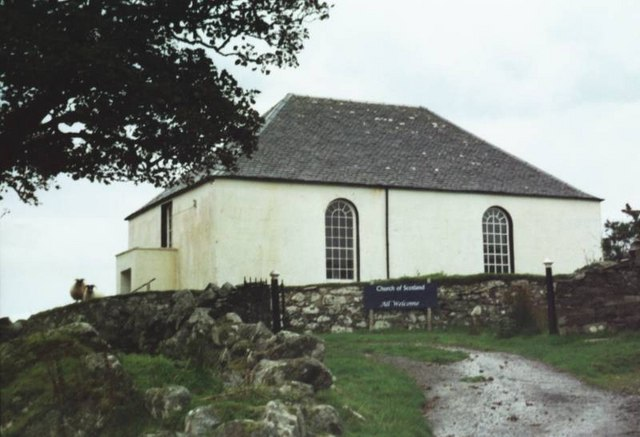
- Colonsay Parish Church
- Colonsay Parish Church
- 56°4′4″N 6°11′46″W
- Location: Colonsay, Argyll and Bute
- Country: Scotland
- Denomination: Church of Scotland

Architecture
- Heritage designation: Category B listed
- Architect: Michael Carmichael
- Style: Georgian architecture
- Groundbreaking: 1801
- Completed: 1804
- Construction cost: £441 11s 6d. (equivalent to £35,600 in 2025)

Specifications
- Capacity: 400 persons

Colonsay Parish Church is a Category B listed Church of Scotland parish church in Scalasaig, Colonsay.

== History ==
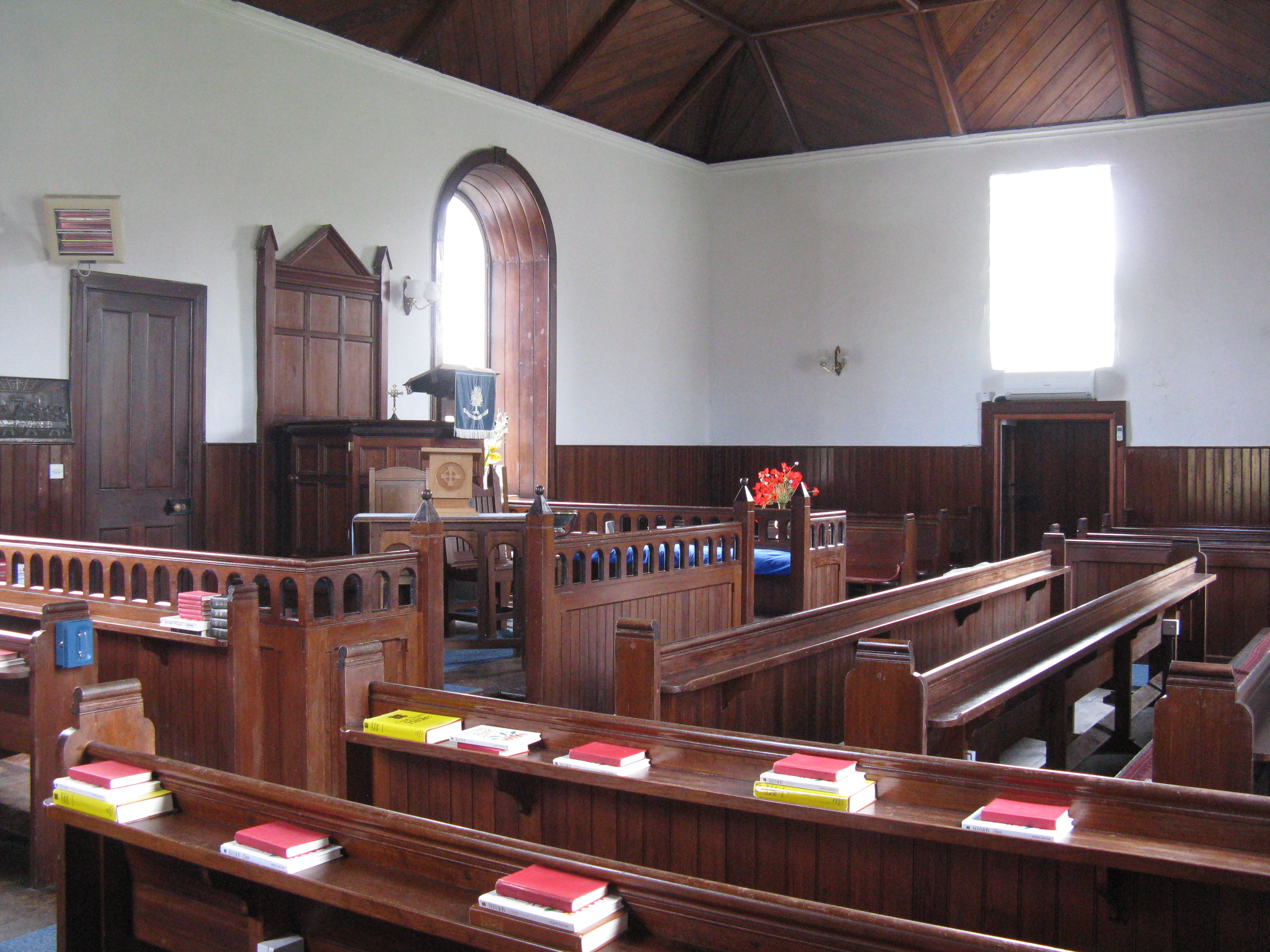
The interior

The church was built in 1801–04 at a cost of £441 11s 6d. The architect is said to be Michael Carmichael. Originally there were galleries at both ends reached by external staircases, but these no longer exist, perhaps removed in a re-ordering ca. 1912.

The church was built as a chapel in the parish of Jura, but became independent in 1861 when James MacKenzie was appointed the first minister.

In 2016 the church merged with the Baptist congregation and is completely ecumenical. In 2023 it was proposed to merge the parish with that at Netherlorn.

== Ministers ==
- James Bannatyne MacKenzie 1861-1872 (afterwards minister in Kenmore)
- Donald MacLean 1873-1880 (formerly minister in North Uist, afterwards minister on Harris)
- Dugald Carmichael 1881-1915 (formerly assistant minister at Kilcalmonell and Kilberry)
- Kenneth MacLeod 1917-1923 (afterwards minister at Gigha Parish Church)
- Angus MacFadyen 1925-1930
- Iain Bryce MacCalman 1930-1938 (afterwards minister at Tayside and Kirk o’ the Muir)
- Duncan MacNeill 1939-1943
- John Y. Clark 1943-1952 (formerly minister at Braemar)
- Samuel Lipp 1954–1956 (formerly minister at Longformacus, afterwards minister at Eassie, Glamis)
- Alisdair R. E Maclnnes 1958-1963
- Frederick R. Hurst 1965-1971
- Ronald L. Crawford 1974-1988
