= Colonsay =

Island in the Inner Hebrides of Scotland

Colbhasa (Gaelic); Colonsay (Scots)
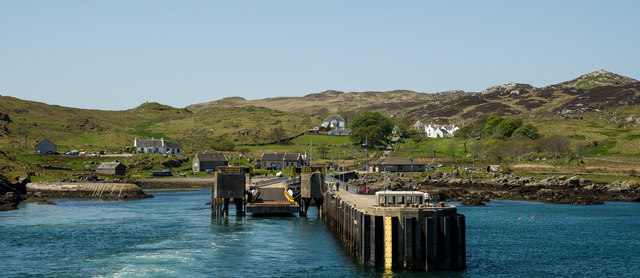
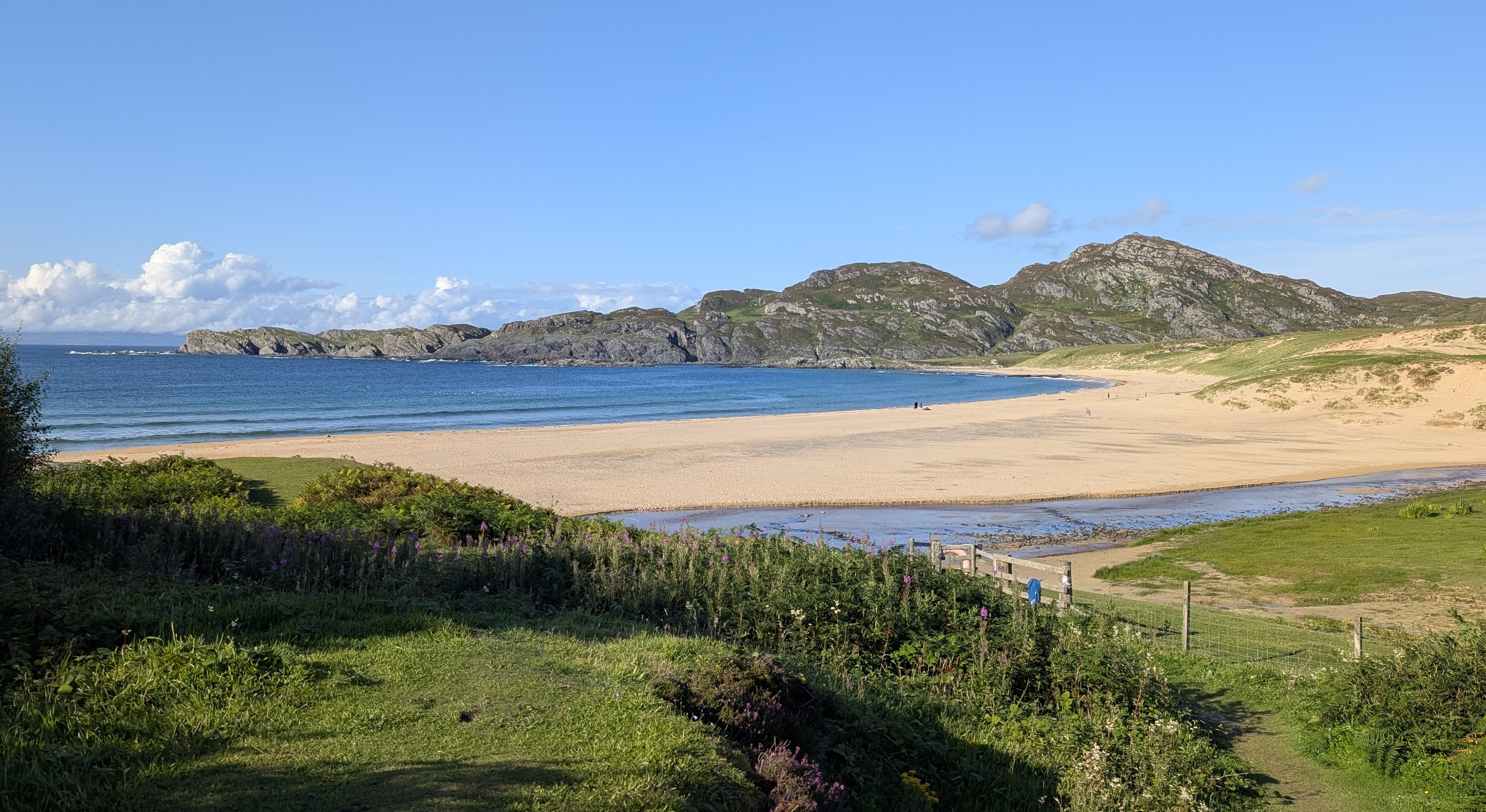
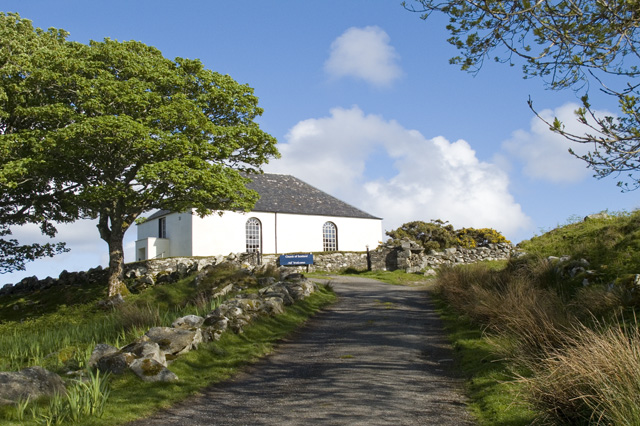
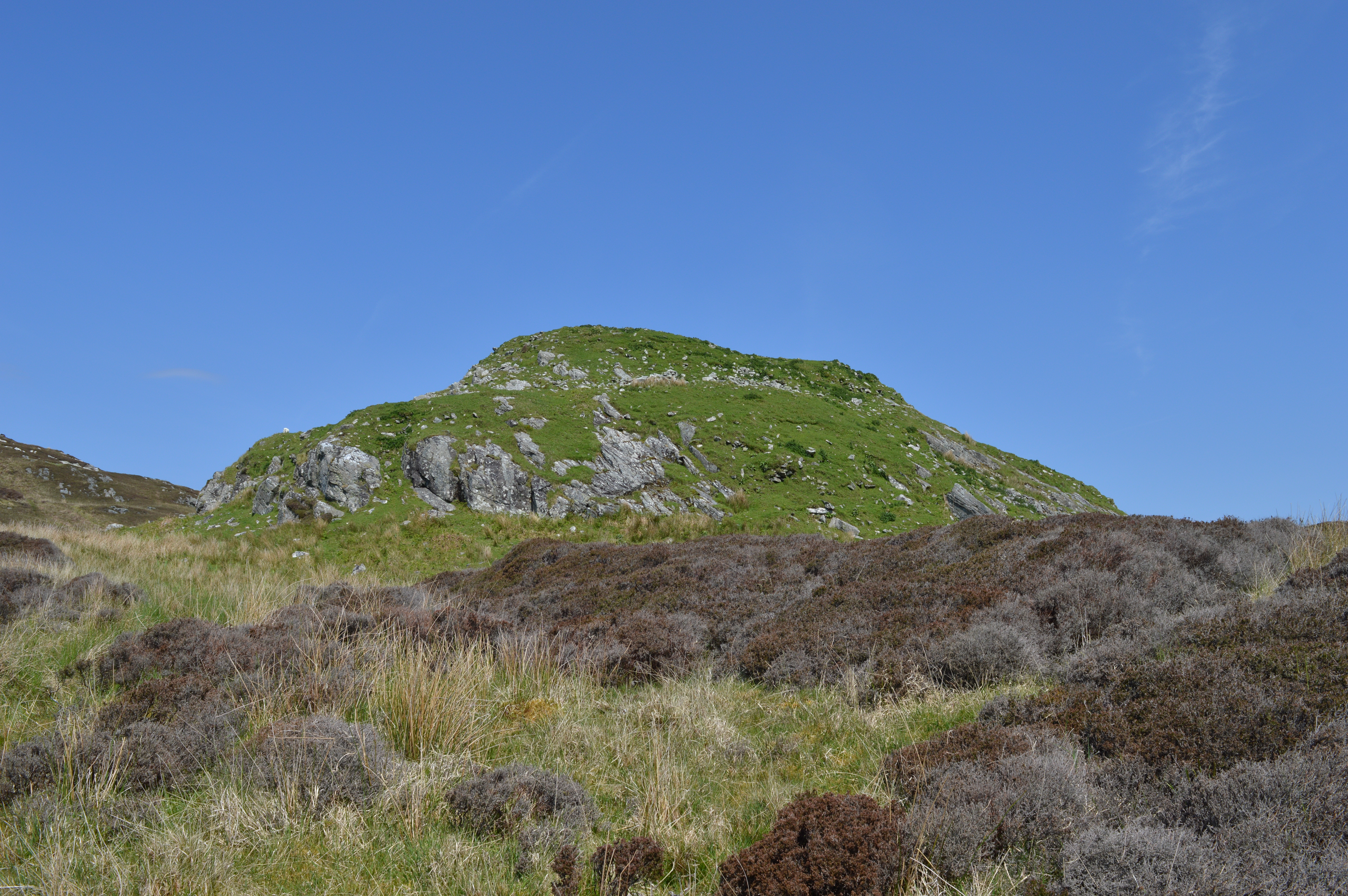
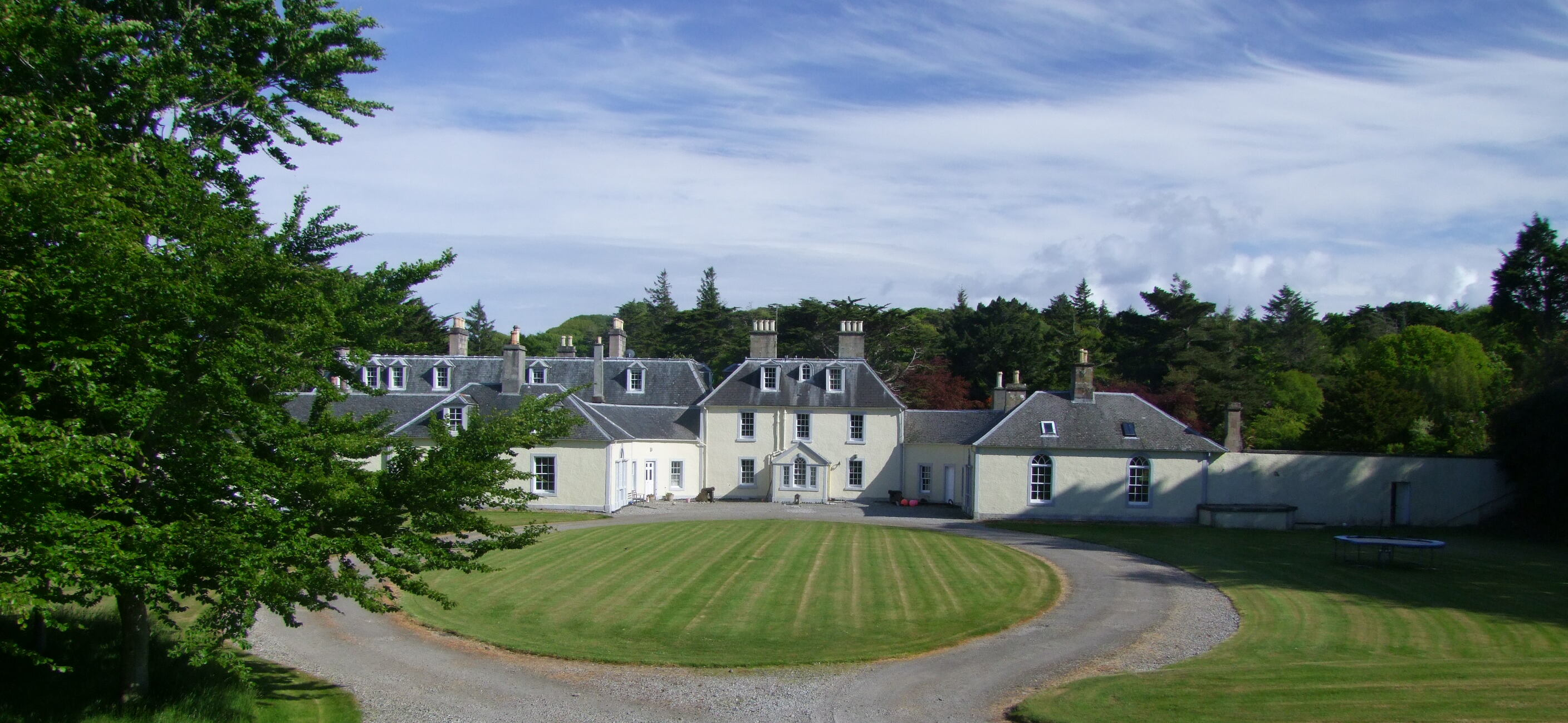
- Scalasaig Kiloran Bay Scalasaig Church Dùn Eibhinn Colonsay House

Location
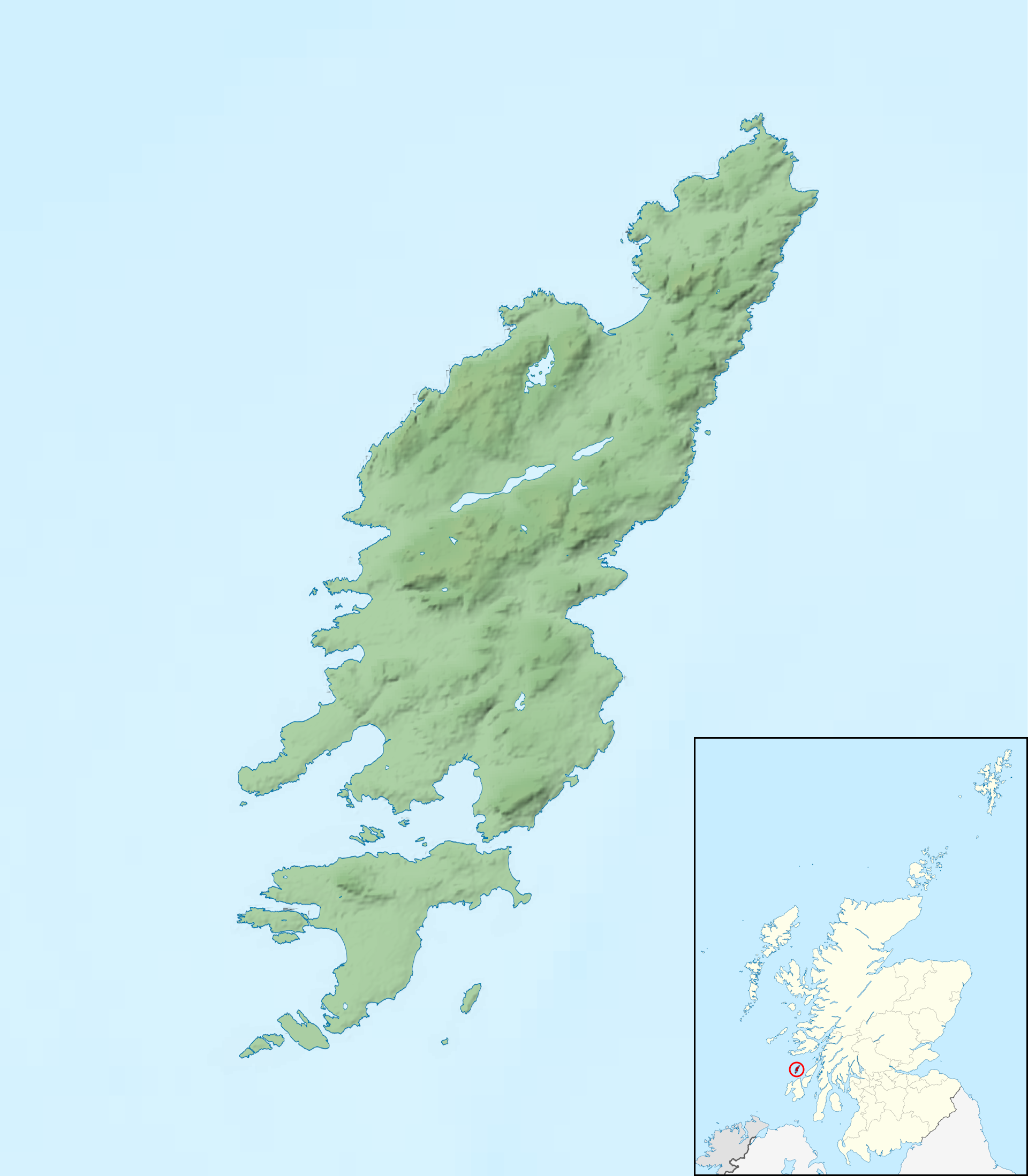
- Map of Colonsay & surrounding islands Colonsay shown within Argyll and Bute Colonsay shown within Scotland
- OS grid reference: NR382938
- Coordinates: 56.06°N 6.21°W

Name
- Gaelic pronunciation: [ˈkʰɔl̪ˠɔ.əs̪ə] [ˈkɔl̪ˠasa] in local dialect
- Name meaning: Old Norse for 'Columba's isle'
- Old Norse name: Colonsey

Physical geography
- Island group: Islay
- Area: 4,074 ha (15 3/4 sq mi)
- Area rank: 26
- Highest elevation: 143 m (469 ft)

Administration
- Council area: Argyll and Bute
- Country: Scotland
- Sovereign state: United Kingdom

Demographics
- Population: 117
- Population rank: 43
- Population density: 2.5/km^{2} (6.5/sq mi)
- Largest settlement: Scalasaig
- Scalasaig Lighthouse
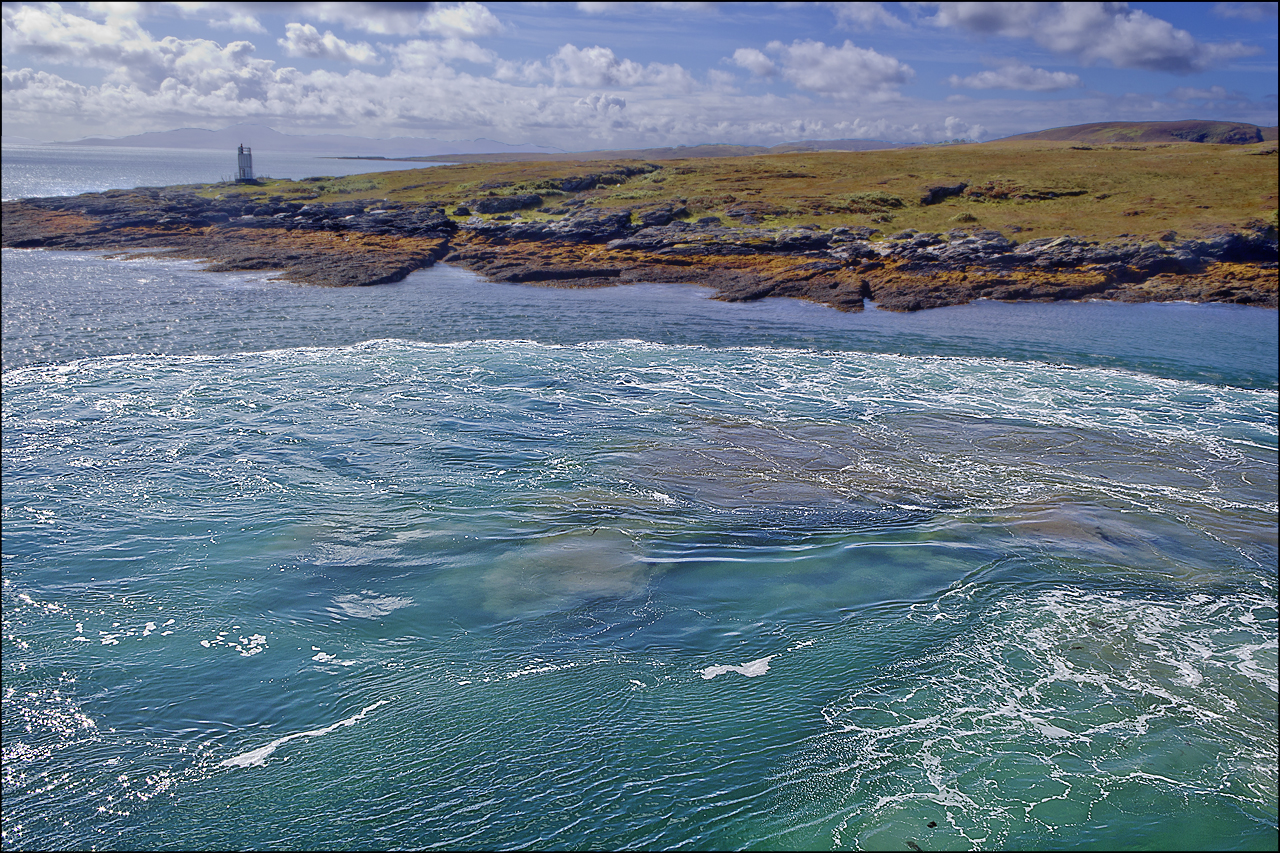
- Constructed: 1903 (first); 1957 (second)
- Foundation: reinforced concrete
- Construction: metal skeletal tower
- Automated: 2003
- Height: 8 m (26 ft)
- Shape: quadrangular tower covered by aluminium panels with balcony and light on the top
- Markings: White
- Power source: solar power
- Operator: Northern Lighthouse Board
- First lit: 2003 (current)
- Deactivated: 1957 (first); 2003 (second)
- Focal height: 5 m (16 ft)
- Range: 8 nmi (15 km; 9.2 mi) (white), 6 nmi (11 km; 6.9 mi) (red)
- Characteristic: Fl(2) WR 10s

Colonsay (Note: /ˈkɒlənzeɪ/; Scottish Gaelic: Colbhasa; Scots: Colonsay) is an island in the Inner Hebrides of Scotland, located north of Islay and south of Mull. The ancestral home of Clan Macfie and the Colonsay branch of Clan MacNeil, it is in the council area of Argyll and Bute and has an area of 4,074 hectares (10,070 acres). Aligned on a south-west to north-east axis, it measures 8 miles (13 kilometres) in length and reaches 3 mi (5 km) at its widest point.

== Geology ==
The Colonsay Group, which takes its name from the island, is an estimated 5,000-metre-thick (16,000 ft) sequence of mildly metamorphosed Neoproterozoic sedimentary rocks that also outcrop on the islands of Islay and Oronsay and the surrounding seabed. The sequence has been correlated with the Grampian Group, the oldest part of the Dalradian Supergroup. It includes the metawackes of the Oronsay Greywacke Formation, the sandstones of the Dun Gallain Grit Formation, the metasandstones and metamudstones of the Machrins Arkose, Kilchattan and Milbuie formations, the sandstones and phyllites of the Kiloran Flags Formation and the phyllitic semipelites and quartzites of the Staosnaig Phyllite Formation. In the far north at the north end of Traigh Ban is an outcrop of the orthogneiss of the Palaeoproterozoic age Rhinns Complex named from the larger outcrop on nearby Islay.

Intrusive igneous rocks are represented by diorites and monzonites of the 'North Britain Siluro-Devonian Calc-Alkaline Dyke Suite' seen at Scalasaig and Balnahard. Lamprophyre dykes, assigned to the same suite are also frequently seen intruding the country rocks. Later intrusions took place during the early Palaeogene period and consists of microgabbro dykes assigned to the North Britain Palaeogene Dyke Suite. The island is cut by numerous geological faults many of which are aligned either NE–SW or ENE–WSW.

Superficial deposits consist largely of modern-day beach deposits, some raised marine deposits and blown sand. There are also areas of glacial till of Pleistocene age and of peat formed in the postglacial period.

== Geography ==
Although Colonsay appears bare and somewhat forbidding on approach from the sea, its landscape is varied, with several beautiful sandy beaches, and a sheltered and fertile interior, unusually well-wooded for a Hebridean island. It is linked by a tidal causeway (called The Strand) to Oronsay. The highest point on the island is Carnan Eoin, 143 m (469 ft) above sea level.

=== Climate ===
Colonsay has an oceanic climate (Köppen: Cfb).

Climate data for Colonsay Homefield (9 m or 30 ft asl, averages 1991–2020)
Month	Jan	Feb	Mar	Apr	May	Jun	Jul	Aug	Sep	Oct	Nov	Dec	Year
Record high °C (°F)	12.3 (54.1)	14.0 (57.2)	19.0 (66.2)	21.6 (70.9)	26.4 (79.5)	24.4 (75.9)	27.0 (80.6)	26.0 (78.8)	23.4 (74.1)	18.6 (65.5)	15.9 (60.6)	14.0 (57.2)	27.0 (80.6)
Mean daily maximum °C (°F)	8.2 (46.8)	8.0 (46.4)	9.3 (48.7)	11.3 (52.3)	14.1 (57.4)	15.8 (60.4)	17.2 (63.0)	17.3 (63.1)	16.0 (60.8)	13.0 (55.4)	10.5 (50.9)	8.8 (47.8)	12.5 (54.5)
Daily mean °C (°F)	5.9 (42.6)	5.6 (42.1)	6.7 (44.1)	8.3 (46.9)	10.7 (51.3)	12.7 (54.9)	14.3 (57.7)	14.5 (58.1)	13.3 (55.9)	10.6 (51.1)	8.2 (46.8)	6.4 (43.5)	9.8 (49.6)
Mean daily minimum °C (°F)	3.6 (38.5)	3.3 (37.9)	4.1 (39.4)	5.3 (41.5)	7.3 (45.1)	9.6 (49.3)	11.4 (52.5)	11.7 (53.1)	10.6 (51.1)	8.1 (46.6)	5.9 (42.6)	4.0 (39.2)	7.1 (44.8)
Record low °C (°F)	−5.9 (21.4)	−4.6 (23.7)	−5.8 (21.6)	−3.0 (26.6)	−1.0 (30.2)	2.7 (36.9)	5.4 (41.7)	5.2 (41.4)	0.6 (33.1)	−1.3 (29.7)	−6.6 (20.1)	−7.7 (18.1)	−7.7 (18.1)
Average precipitation mm (inches)	125.4 (4.94)	99.2 (3.91)	93.1 (3.67)	65.6 (2.58)	66.8 (2.63)	74.4 (2.93)	84.4 (3.32)	93.3 (3.67)	108.0 (4.25)	132.2 (5.20)	130.4 (5.13)	134.7 (5.30)	1,207.5 (47.54)
Average precipitation days (≥ 1.0 mm)	20.4	17.3	16.2	12.4	12.1	12.0	14.2	15.5	16.0	19.1	20.0	19.8	195.0
Mean monthly sunshine hours	37.6	73.9	115.6	179.1	224.5	172.5	169.7	168.1	127.9	88.8	49.0	30.2	1,436.9
Source 1: Met Office
Source 2: Starlings Roost Weather

== History ==
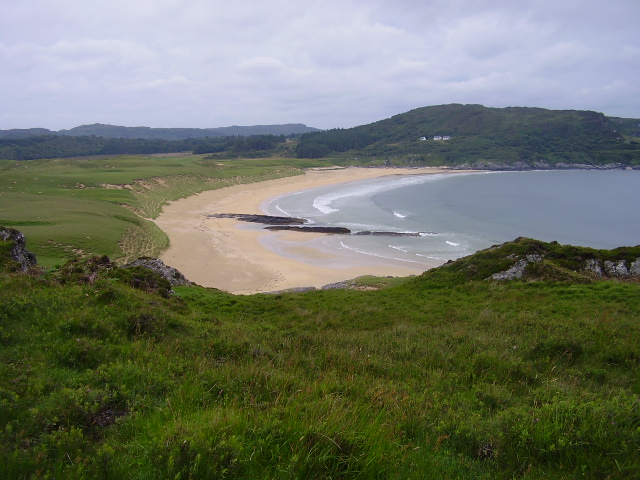
An Tràigh Bhàn, Kiloran Bay

=== Mesolithic food industry ===
In 1995 evidence of large-scale Mesolithic nut shelling, some 8,000 years ago, was found in a midden pit at Staosnaig on the island's sheltered east coast, in a large, shallow pit full of the remains of hundreds of thousands of burned hazelnut shells. Hazelnuts have been found on other Mesolithic sites, but rarely in such quantities or concentrated in one pit. The nuts were radiocarbon dated to 7720±110 BP, which calibrates to c. 6000 BCE. Similar sites in Britain and its dependencies are known only at Farnham in Surrey and at Cass ny Hawin, near Ballasalla on the Isle of Man.

This discovery gives an insight into communal activity and forward planning of the period. The nuts were harvested in a single year and pollen analysis suggests that the hazel trees were all cut down at the same time. The scale of the activity, unparalleled elsewhere in Scotland, and the lack of large game on the island, suggests that Colonsay's inhabitants were largely vegetarian. The pit was originally on a beach close to the shore, and there were two smaller stone-lined pits whose function remains obscure, a hearth, and a second cluster of pits.

=== Early history ===
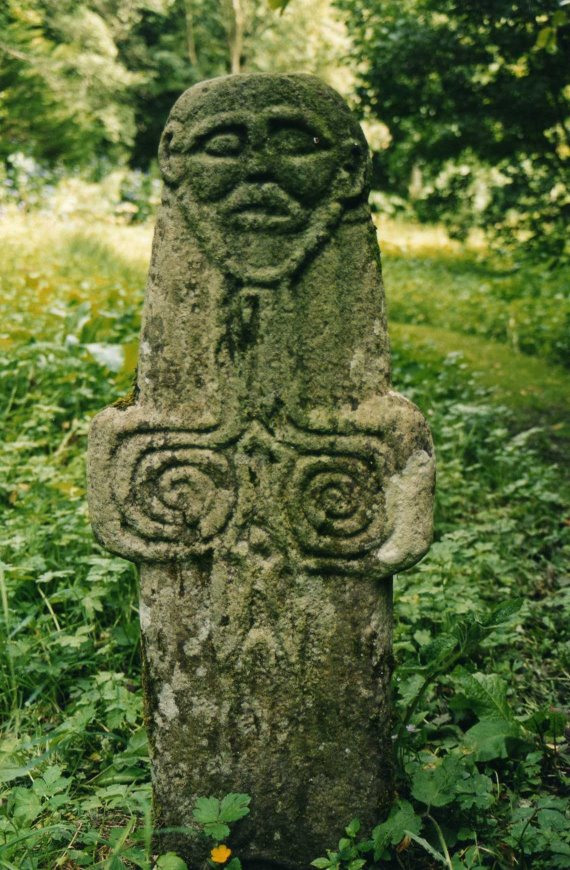
The Riasg Buidhe Cross

There are a variety of ruined hill forts on the island such as Dùn Cholla and Dùn Meadhonach. The 8th-century Riasg Buidhe Cross has been re-erected in the gardens of Colonsay House. St Cathan's Chapel may date from the 14th century. The ruins of the Chapel of St Mary are little more than foundations and may date to an even earlier period. in 1549 Dean Monro wrote that Colonsay was "seven myle lange from the northeist to the southwest, with twa myle bredthe, ane fertile ile guid for quhit fishing. It hath ane paroch kirke. This ile is bruikit be ane gentle capitane, callit M'Duffyhe, and pertened of auld to Clandonald of Kyntyre."

A Viking grave at Kiloran Bay, including a boat and silver burial goods, was discovered in 1882 on land belonging to John MacNeil.

=== Ownership ===
During the 18th century the lairds of the island were McNeils and included Archibald MacNeil. Colonsay House was first built by the McNeil family in 1722. In 1904 the estate of Colonsay was bought by Donald Smith, 1st Baron Strathcona and Mount Royal from the trustees of the late Major-General Sir John Carstairs McNeill V.C. Since then Colonsay House has been the property of the Barons Strathcona and Mount Royal family. Colonsay House is currently occupied by Alexander Howard, 5th Baron Strathcona and Mount Royal and his family.

Today, in addition to estate land, the ownership of Colonsay is a mixture of owner-occupied housing, social housing, public and community-owned land and businesses, holiday homes and crofting land.

=== Services ===
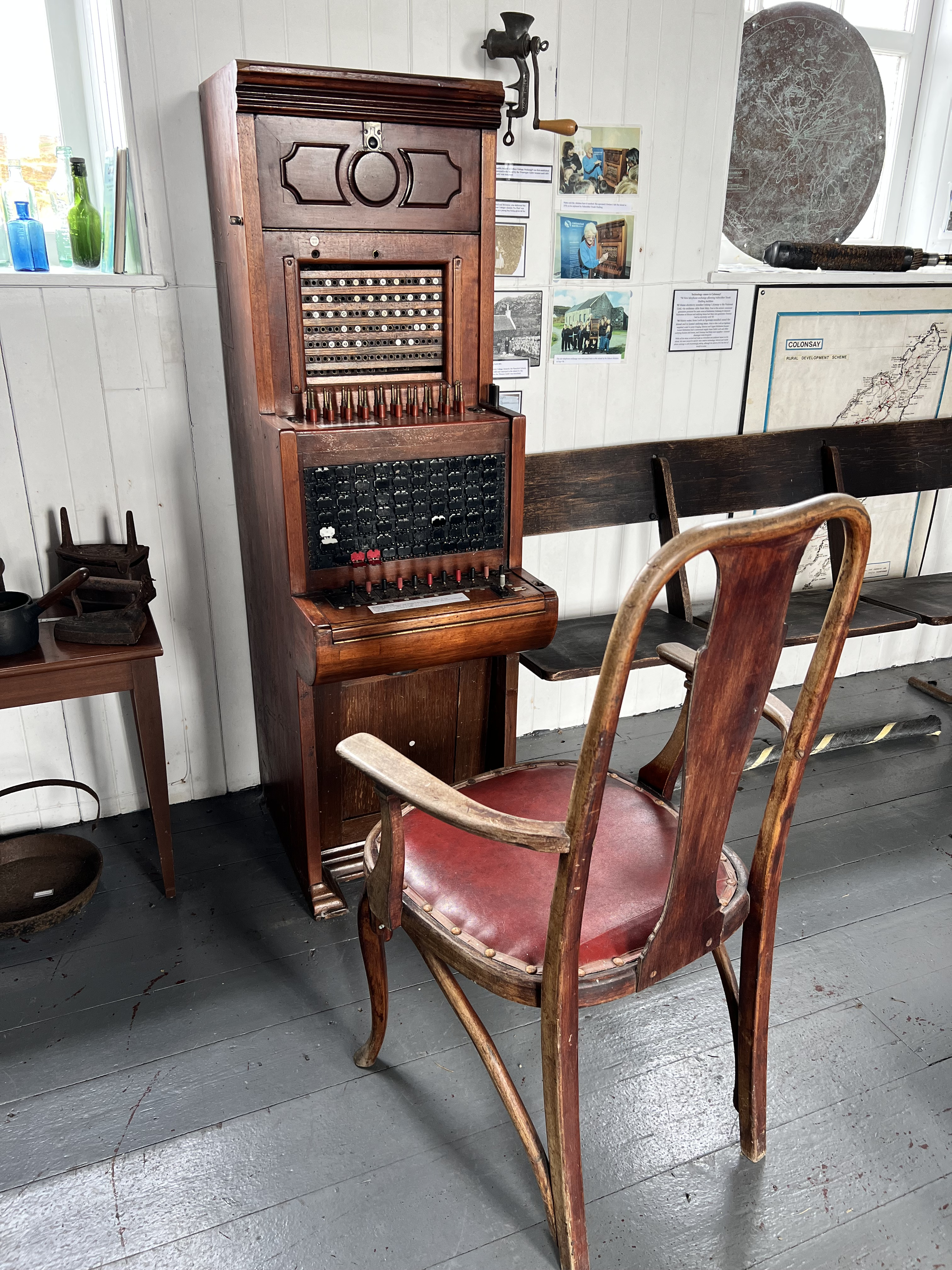
The telephone exchange used until 1974 when Subscriber Trunk Dialling was introduced. This exchange on show in the Colonsay and Oronsay Heritage Trust Museum.

A sub-post office was established in 1871 with mail conveyed to the island by the steamer Dunvegan Castle. A new post office was constructed in 1881 by the harbour in Scalasaig. In 1893 islanders petitioned the Postmaster-General to provide a telegraph service to the islands. The islanders were unable to raise the £120 guarantee required by the Post Office. Later a new arrangement was agreed and a guarantee of £60 was provided. Telegraphic submarine cables were laid to Port Askaig in Islay and connected with the mainland on 2 August 1897. In 1905 a telephone was installed in Colonsay House requiring new poles and wires routed from the Post Office. Subscriber Trunk Dialling was introduced in 1974 and the old telephone exchange was made redundant.

The Scotland Hydro-Electric Board developed plans to provide the island with electricity, but this was dropped when local generation of electricity began in 1952 with a scheme funded by Colonsay Estate. Scalasaig, Glassaird, Kiloran and Colonsay House had local generators installed by Messrs Scott of Glasgow.

In 1983 the island was connected to the National Grid with a 11,000 volt 13.5-mile (21.7 km) under-sea cable from Islay.

=== Fishing ===
The Annual Reports of the Fishery Board for Scotland provide an insight into the state of fishing from Colonsay in the years before the First World War. The catch typically consisted of lobsters which were caught in creels around the island.

Fishery Statistics

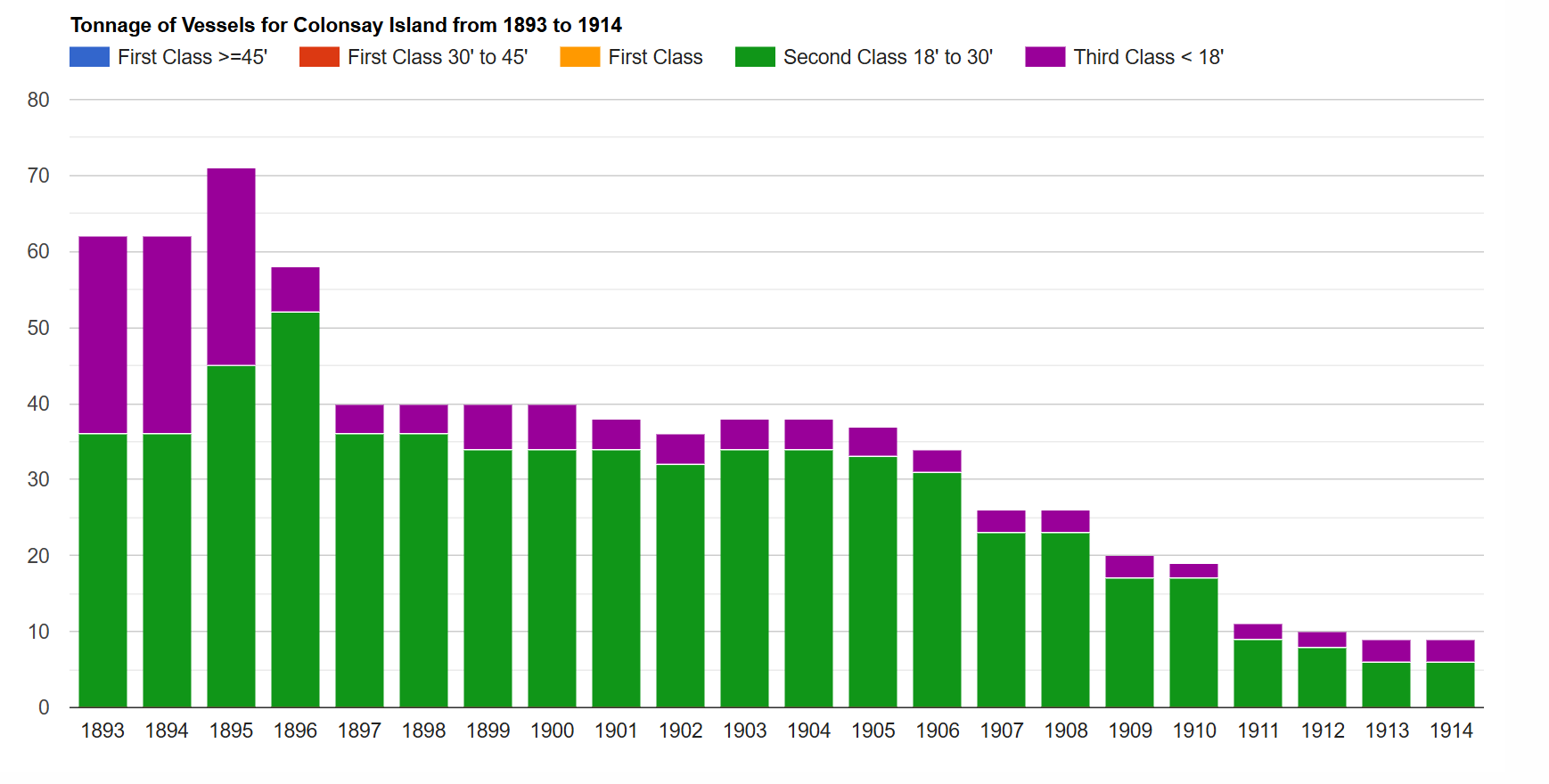
Tonnage of vessels

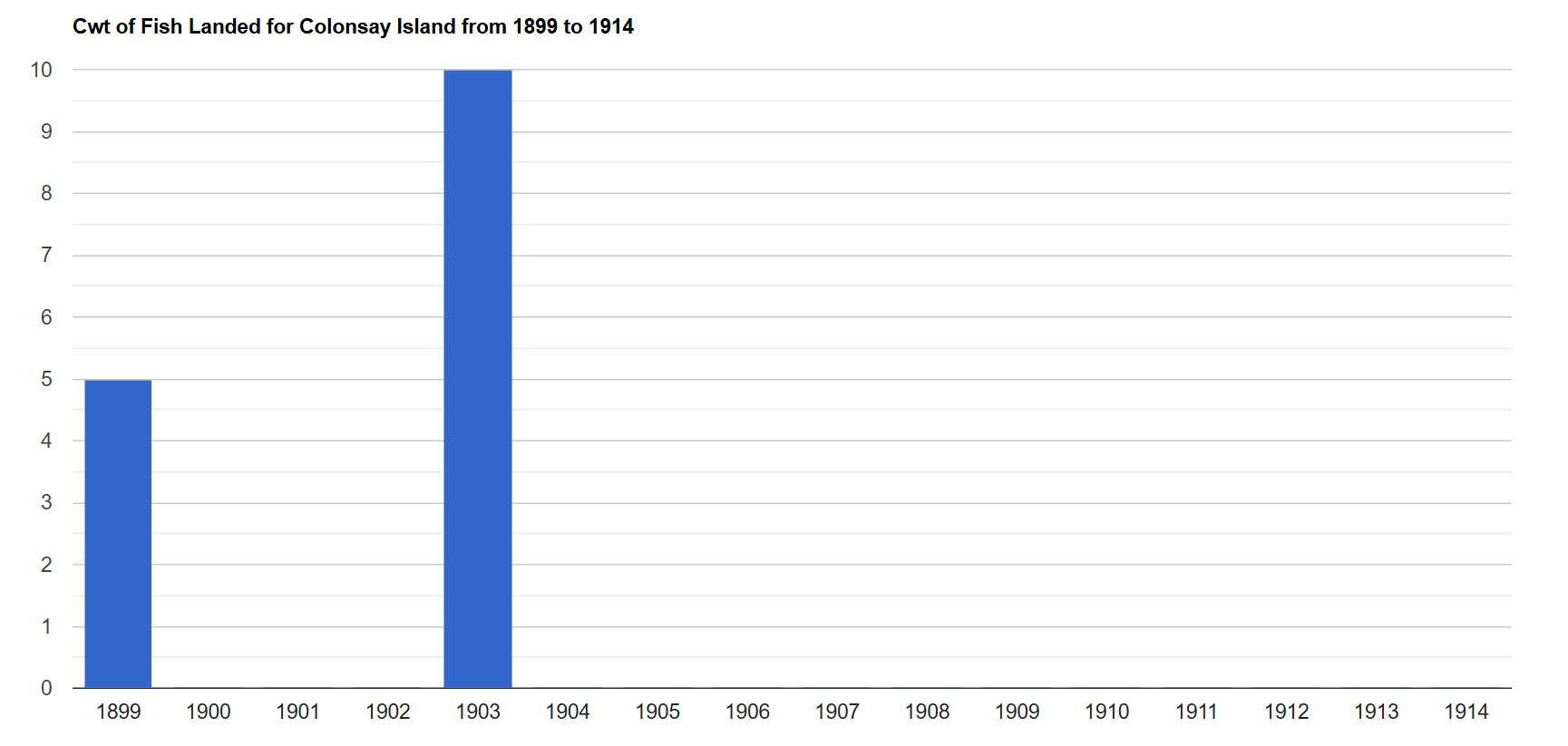
Cwt of fish landed

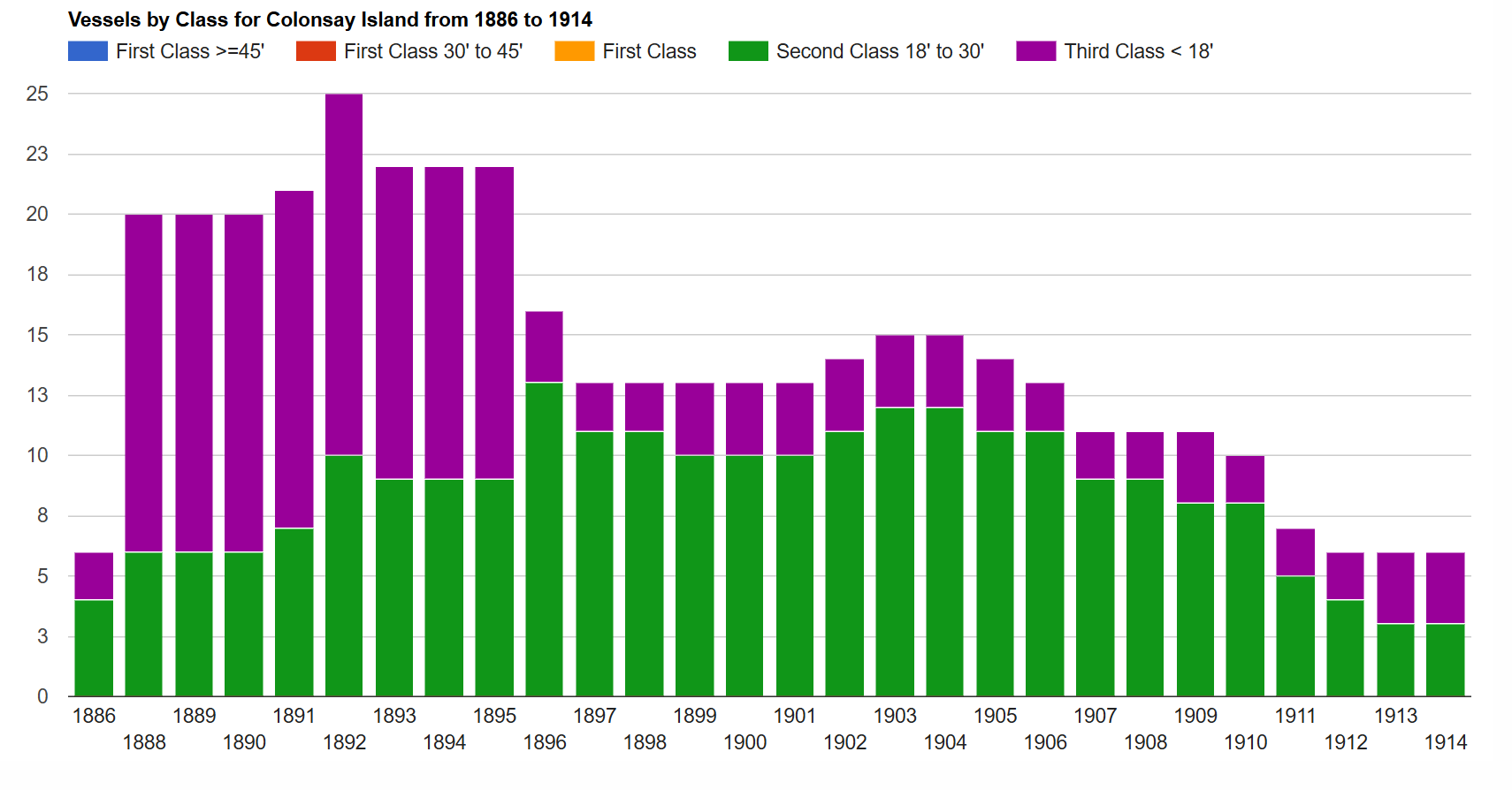
Vessels by class

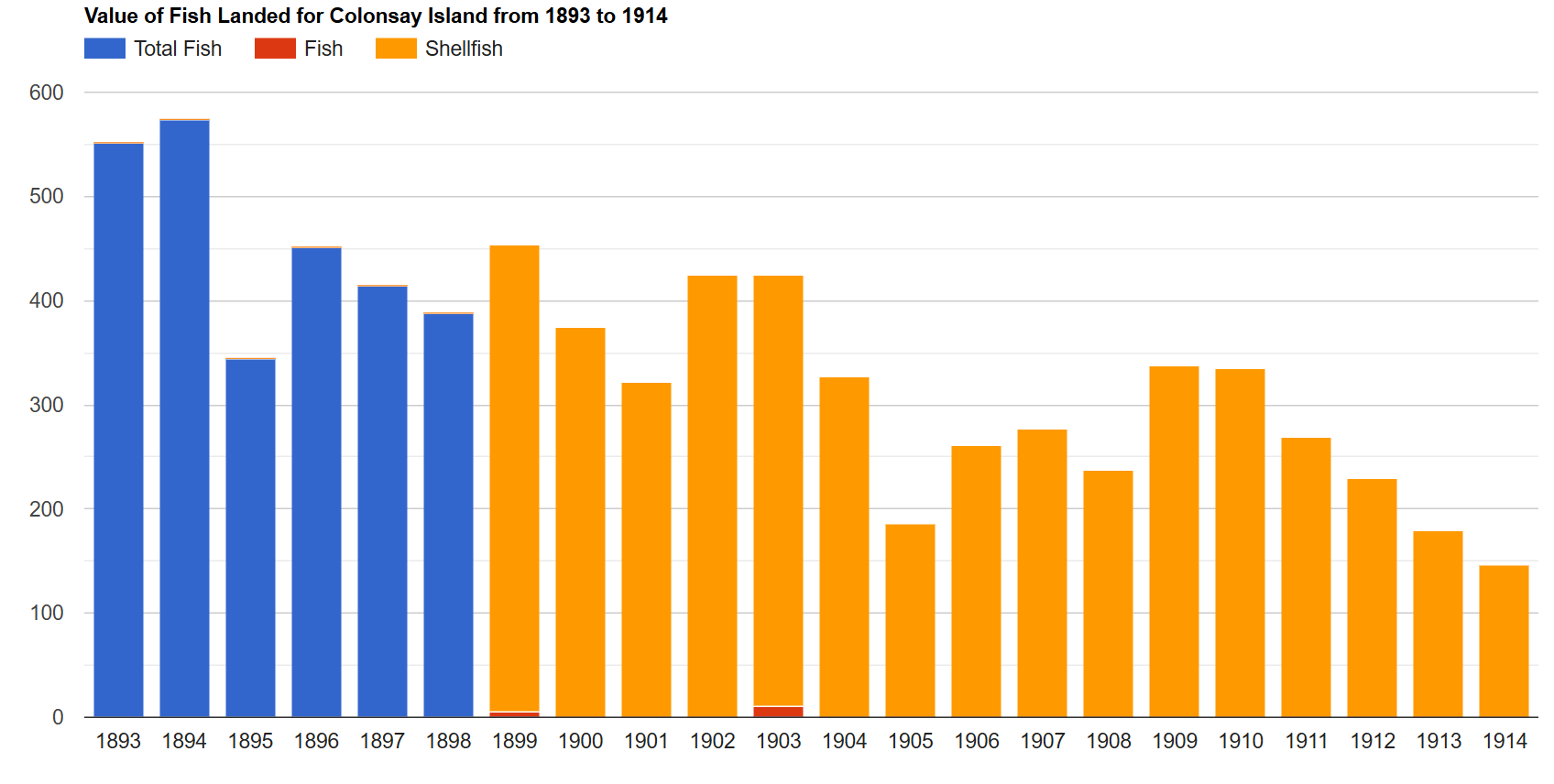
Value (£) of fish landed

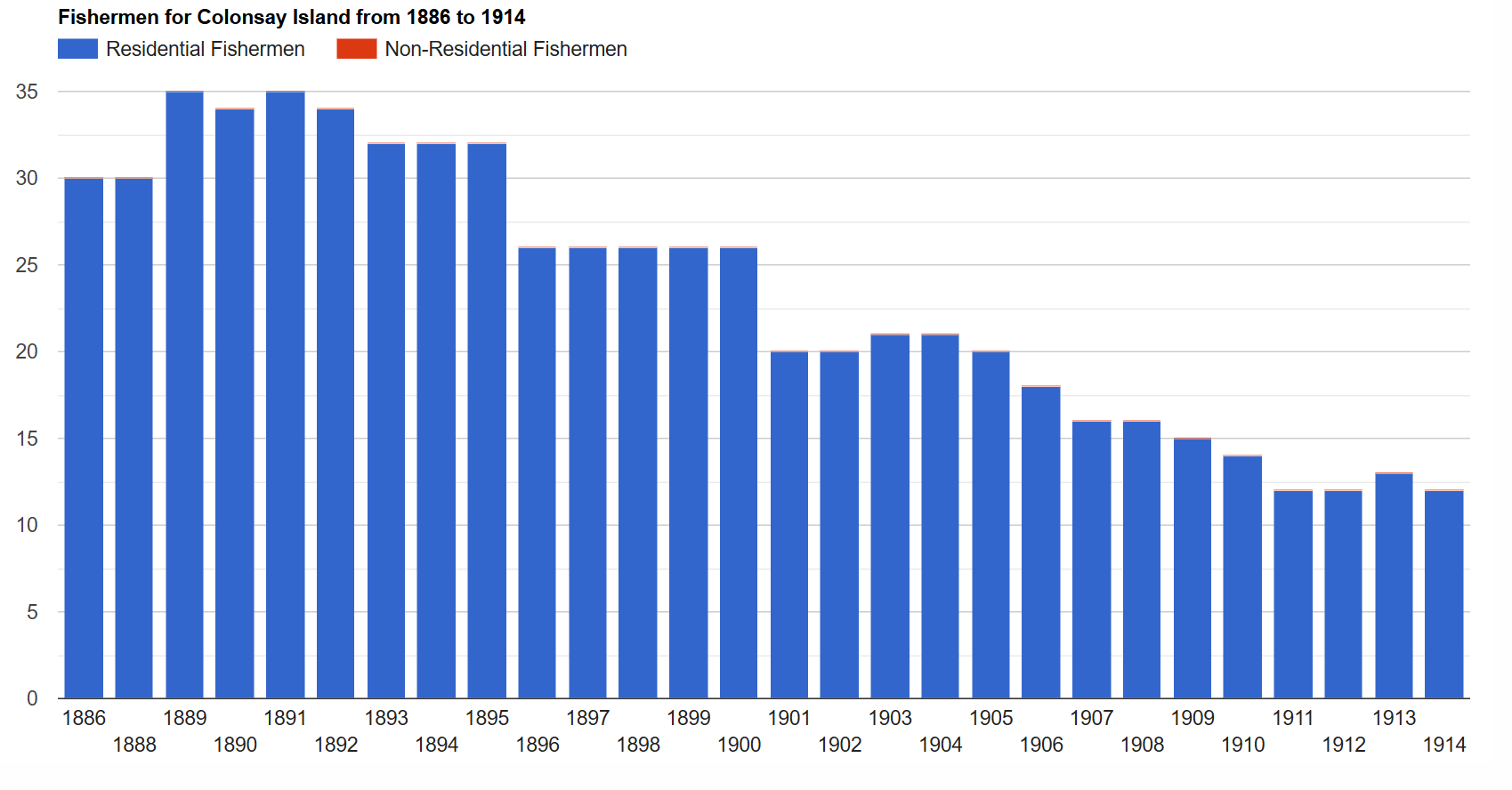
Fishermen

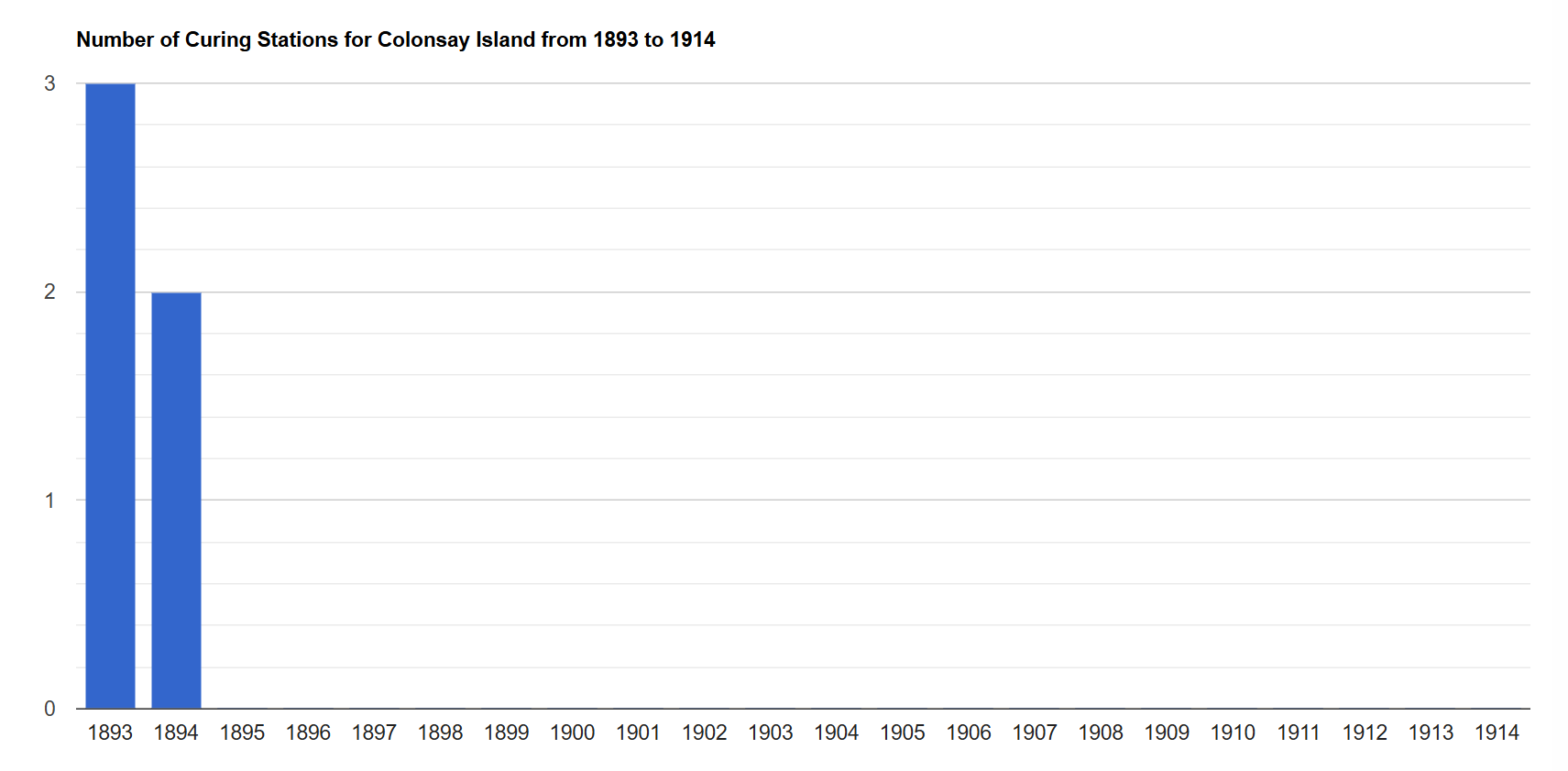
Number of curing stations

== Present day ==
The island's population was 124 as recorded by the 2011 census, an increase of nearly 15% since 2001 when there were 108 usual residents. During the same period Scottish island populations as a whole grew by 4% to 103,702. At the time of the 2022 census the population was 117. Colonsay's main settlement is Scalasaig (Scottish Gaelic: Sgalasaig) on the east coast.

Recently there has been a growth of tourism as the mainstay of the island's economy, with numerous holiday cottages, many of them owned and managed by the Isle of Colonsay Estate. The Colonsay Hotel, the only hotel on the island, is independently owned.

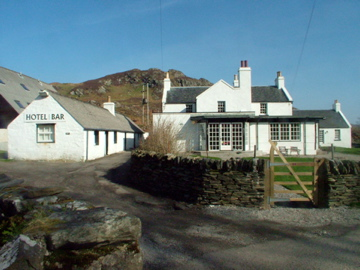
Colonsay Hotel, the island's only pub and hotel.

The island has a tiny bookshop specialising in books of local interest; it is also the home of the House of Lochar publishing company, specialising in Scottish history. The hotel overlooks the harbour, and there are also a café and bakery, a shop and post office. Colonsay's best-known beach, Kiloran Bay, is a vast stretch of golden sands and draws locals and tourists alike while maintaining an isolated and peaceful atmosphere.

Colonsay Community Development Company, the local development trust, is "engaged in a range of work which reflects a sustainable approach to the regeneration of our island". Current projects include running the island's coal supply and only petrol pump, a major Rhododendron ponticum eradication programme and a feasibility study into the possibility of improving the harbour and surrounding area.

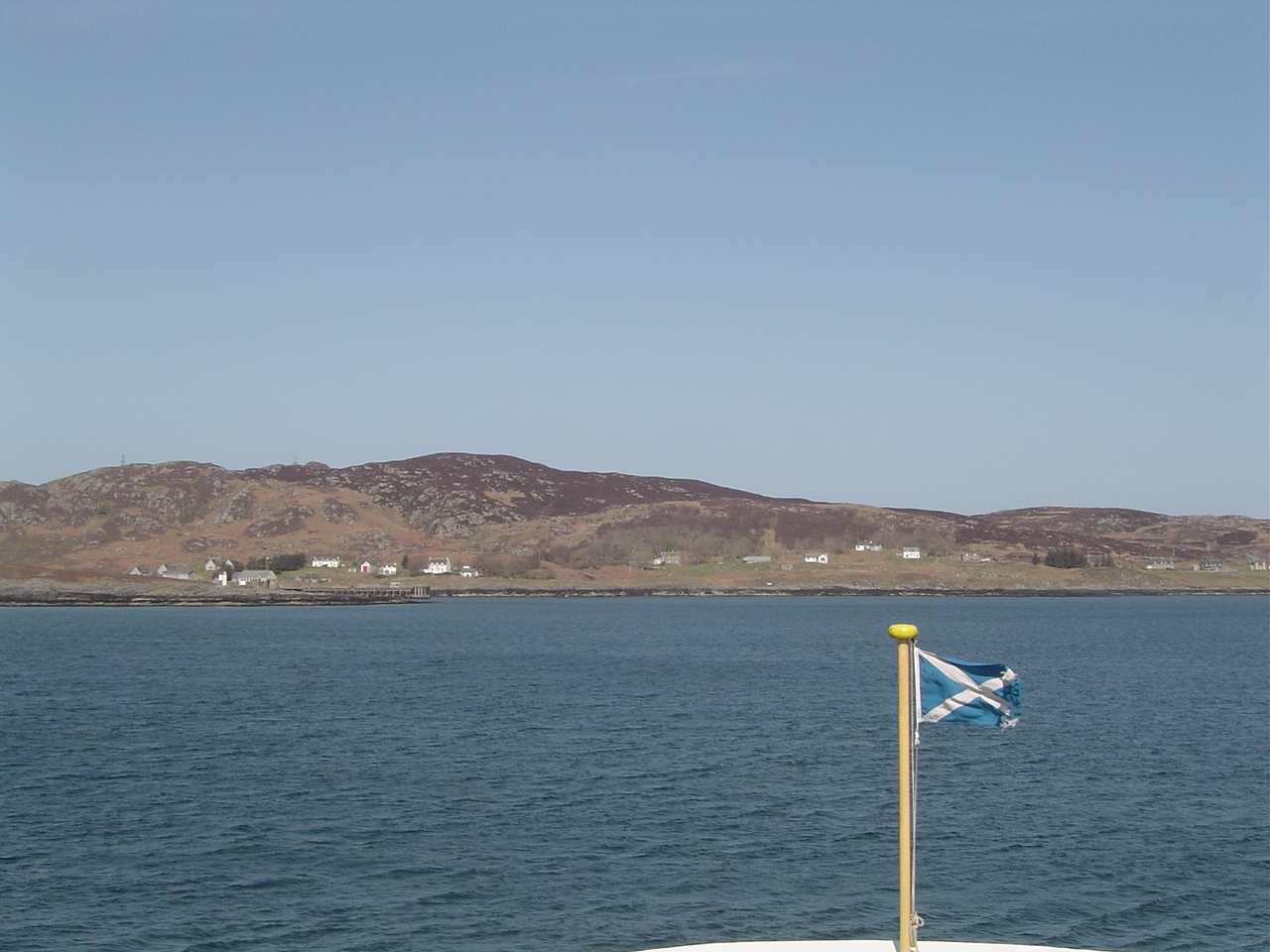
Scalasaig from the Port Askaig ferry

2007 saw the opening of the Colonsay Brewery, a micro-brewery that employs two people and offers three different products. Colonsay is the smallest island in the world with its own brewery. In 2016 the brewery launched a gin, called Wild Island Botanic Gin, distilled with hand-gathered wild botanicals from the island. It is distilled at Langley Distillery in a cooperation with master distiller Rob Dorset. In February 2017 a company called Wild Thyme Spirits Ltd, started by husband and wife team Finlay and Eileen Geekie who moved to Colonsay from Oxfordshire in 2016, brought out a product called Colonsay Gin. Initially distilled off the island, production moved to Colonsay in 2018. Wild Thyme Spirits went into court-ordered liquidation in August 2025.

The nature of island life was exemplified by a story reported in 1993 that, at that time, the last recorded crime was treachery against the king in 1623. In November 2006 a construction worker from Glasgow was arrested and confessed to theft by housebreaking, having entered an unlocked house and stolen £60 in cash. Media interest was stirred when it was reported that this was the first recorded crime since 2004 and the "first ever theft from a house". The next reported crime was in 2013 involving vandalism to a car.

Colonsay may be the smallest island ever to host a rugby festival, all the more remarkable as there is no permanent rugby pitch.

== Transport ==
Caledonian MacBrayne ferries sail to Oban, and to Kennacraig via Port Askaig on Islay.

In 2006 the former grass airstrip was upgraded and provided with a hard surface in readiness for the introduction of a scheduled air service. Hebridean Air Services operates scheduled services from Oban Airport and charter services from Islay Airport to Colonsay Airport.

Preceding station	Ferry	Following station
Oban	Caledonian MacBrayne; Ferry	Port Askaig (limited service)

== The arts ==
The 1945 film I Know Where I'm Going!, directed by Michael Powell and Emeric Pressburger, was principally shot on Mull and references the fictional "Isle of Kiloran", which was based on Colonsay. The American author John McPhee, descended from a Colonsay emigrant, spent a summer on Colonsay, out of which was published The Crofter and the Laird in 1969.

In 2008, Colonsay hosted the first ever Ceòl Cholasa, the island's own folk festival. This has now become an annual event and has seen performances by numerous well-known artists including Phil Cunningham & Aly Bain, Karen Matheson, and Karine Polwart as well as performances from local island musicians.

Since 2011 the island has held a three-week "Festival of Spring" annually in May. Its aim is to encourage tourism onto the island, with events and activities led by both local inhabitants and visiting guest "speakers/experts". A similar event occurs every autumn, called "Connect with Colonsay", which runs over a three-week period in October.

In 2012 the island staged its first annual book festival which featured, amongst others, Alexander McCall Smith, James Robertson, and Scots Makar Liz Lochhead. The line up for 2013 was headed by crime writer Ian Rankin.

== Wildlife ==
The island is home to a herd of wild goats, and is known for its bird life including black-legged kittiwakes, cormorants, guillemots, corncrakes and golden eagles.

Colonsay and Oronsay are home to about 50 colonies of the European dark bee, Apis mellifera mellifera. The Scottish Government introduced the Bee Keeping (Colonsay and Oronsay) Order 2013 to prevent cross-breeding with other honeybees (Apis mellifera) and to protect it from diseases common on the mainland. From 1 January 2014 it has been an offence to keep any other honeybee on either island. The 'Environment and Climate Change' Minister, Paul Wheelhouse MSP, said: "The Bee Keeping Order illustrates how our non-native species legislation can be used to protect our native wildlife. The order is a targeted measure to protect an important population of black bees on Colonsay from hybridisation with non-native bees" (the "non-native species legislation" was used because Apis mellifera are considered to be non-native to Colonsay, but considered native to Scotland as it was the first honey bee to be introduced for use in beekeeping there). The bees on Colonsay are now referred to as the "Colonsay Dark Native Bee". They were collected from across Scotland in the previous thirty years; genetic analysis has shown Australian and New Zealand A. m. ligustica introgression.

== Etymology ==
Colonsay's name derives from Old Norse and means "Kolbein's island" (although Haswell-Smith offers "Columba's island"). In the 14th century the name was recorded as Coluynsay and by Dean Monro in the 16th century as Colvansay. The modern Gaelic is Colbhasa. Scalasaig also has a Norse derivation and means "Skali's bay".

== Notable residents ==
- Donald MacKinnon was born in Kilchattan on Colonsay, in 1839. In 1882, he became the first person appointed to the Chair of Celtic Studies at Edinburgh University. Professor MacKinnon was born on Colonsay in 1839 and held the Celtic Chair from 1882 until his death at Balnahard, Colonsay, in 1914.
- John McNeill, recipient of the Victoria Cross.
- Danny Alexander the ex-Liberal Democrat Member of Parliament for Inverness, Nairn, Badenoch and Strathspey grew up on Colonsay.

== Gallery ==
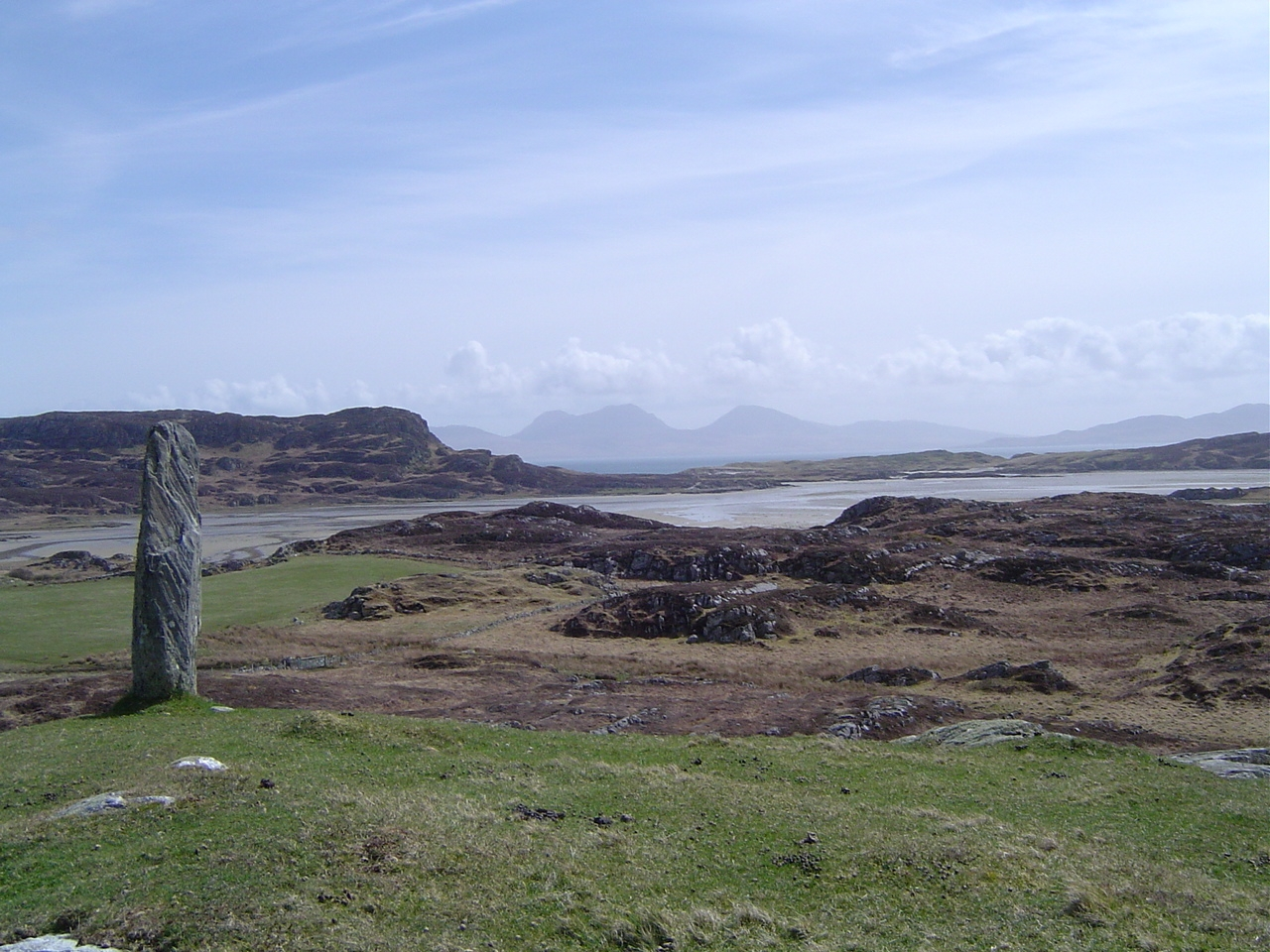
View over Colonsay and Oronsay to the right, the Paps of Jura in the distance

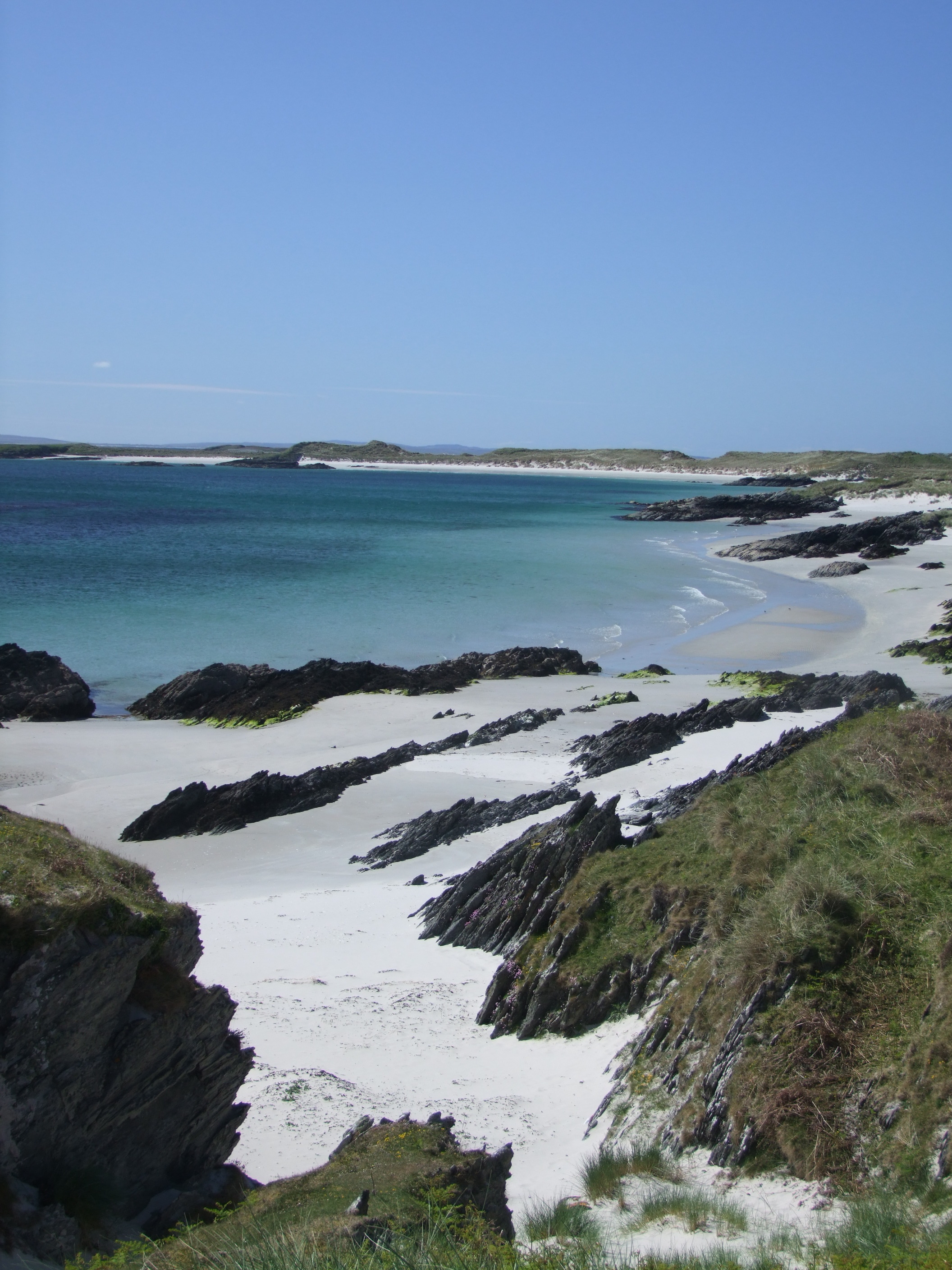
Between Cable Bay and Sir John's Pool on the south east coast with Islay in the distance.

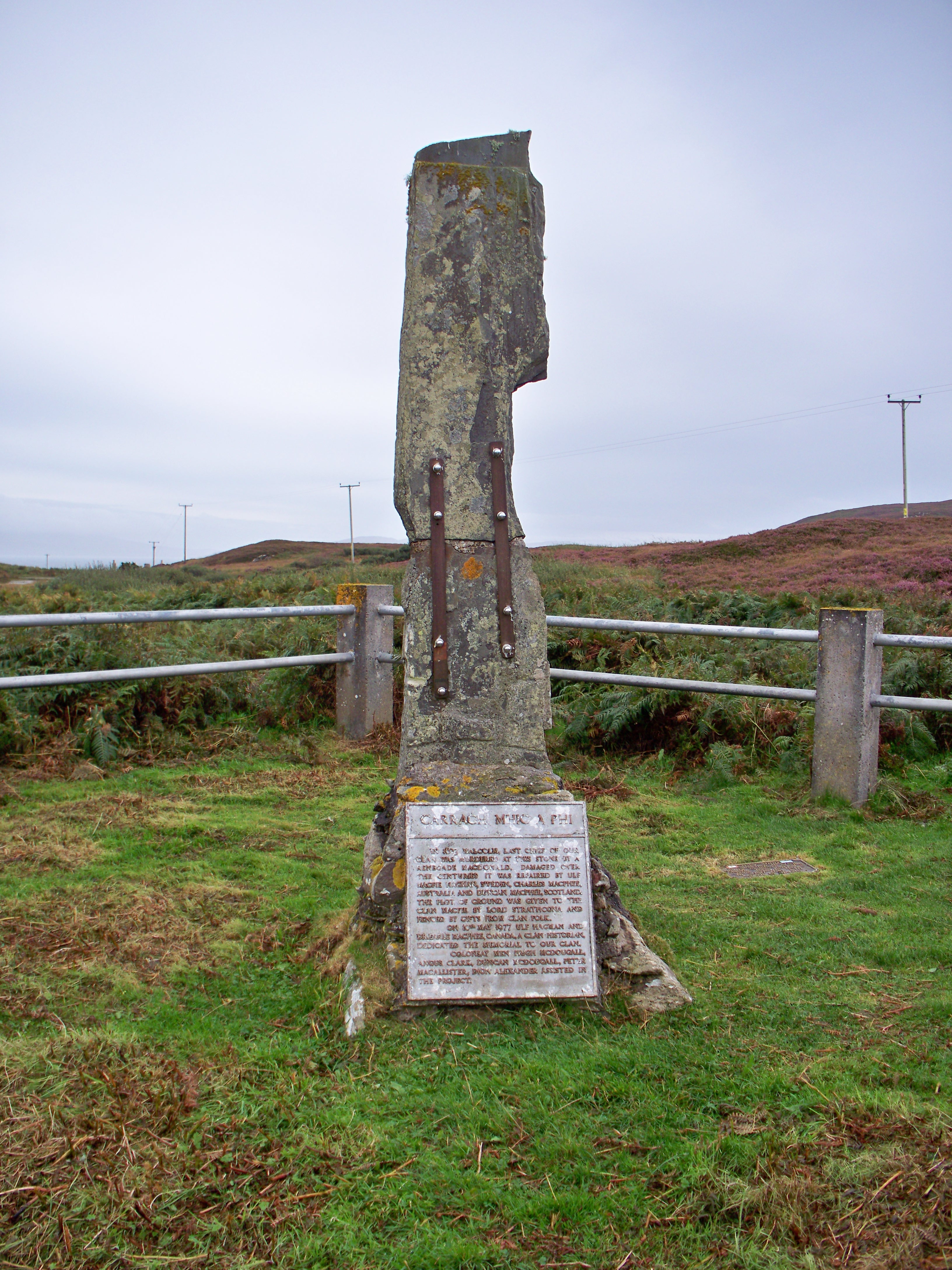
Macfie Standing Stone

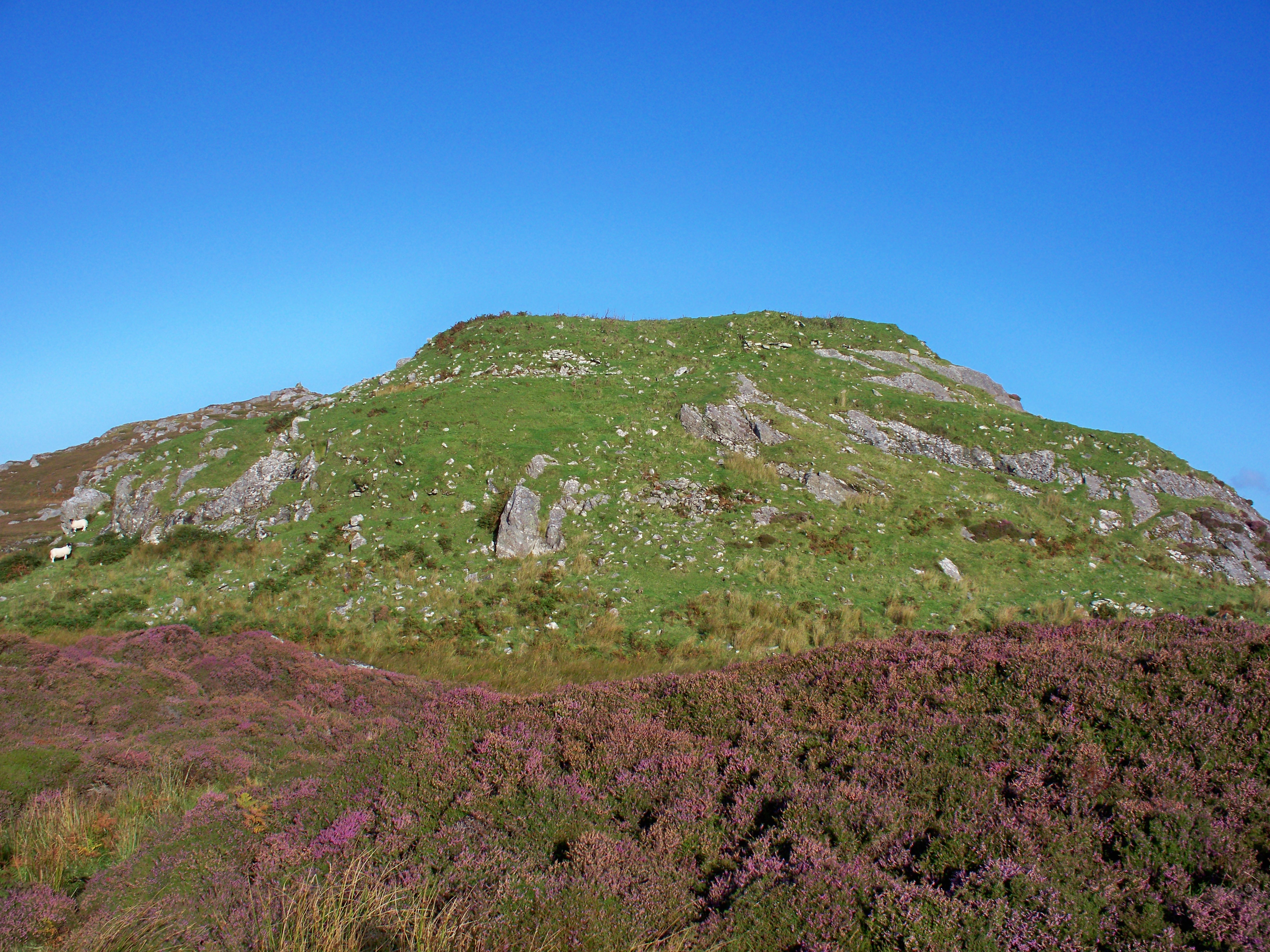
Dùn Eibhinn

== See also ==
- Colonsay Parish Church, Scalasaig
- Colonsay, Saskatchewan, a village in Canada that takes its name from the island.
- List of islands of Scotland
- List of lighthouses in Scotland
- List of Northern Lighthouse Board lighthouses
