= Kilgallioch =

Wind farm in Scotland

Kilgallioch Wind Farm
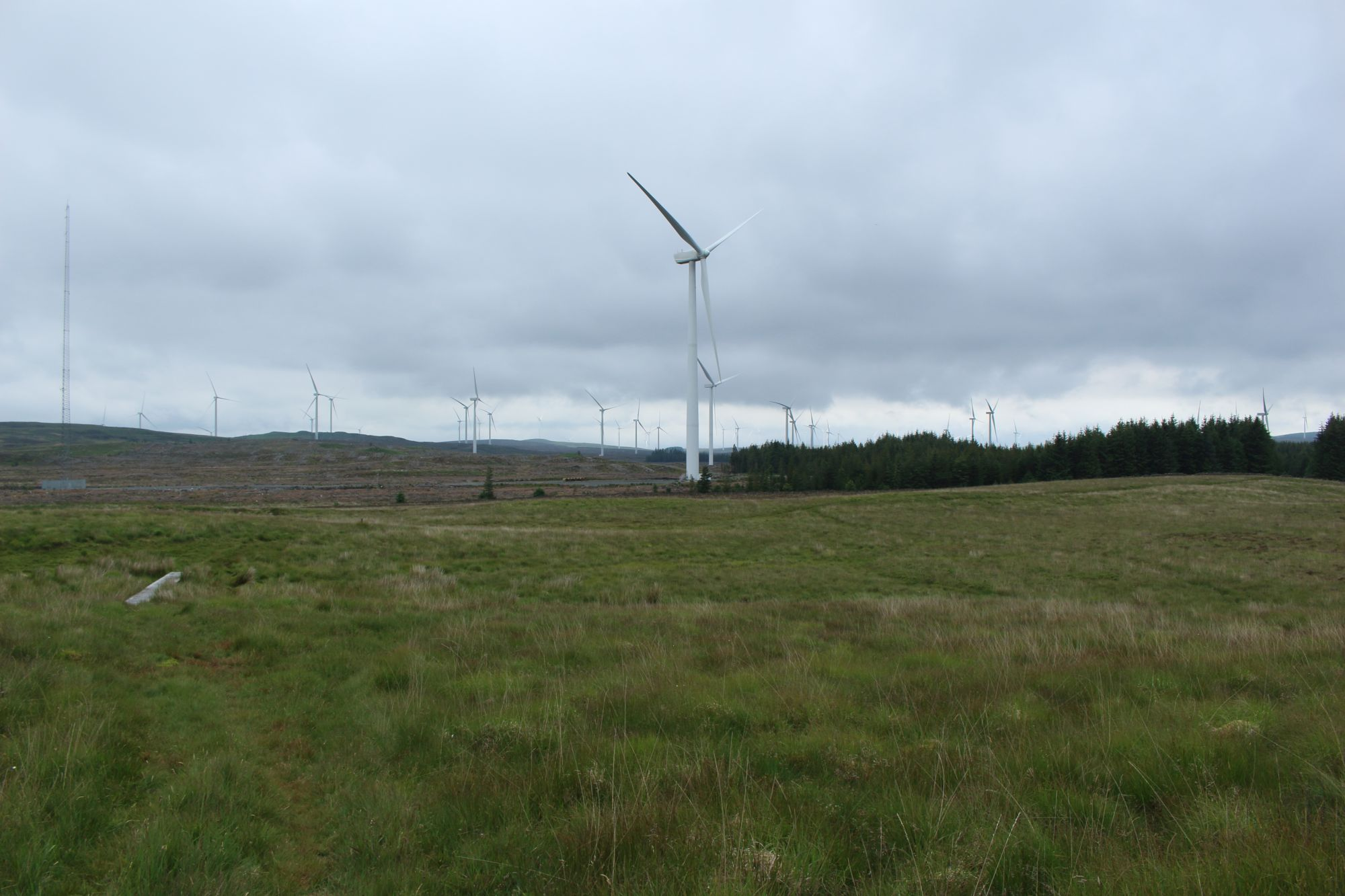
- Country: Scotland, United Kingdom
- Location: South Ayrshire
- Coordinates: 55°03′00″N 4°45′54″W
- Status: Operational
- Construction began: 2015
- Commission date: 2 January 2017
- Owner: ScottishPower
- Operator: ScottishPower

Wind farm
- Rotor diameter: 114 m (374 ft)

Power generation
- Units operational: 2 × 2 MW; 94 × 2.5 MW
- Make and model: Gamesa G114-2.5 MW (94); Gamesa G90-2.0 MW (2)
- Nameplate capacity: 239 MW

External links
- Website: www.scottishpowerrenewables.com/pages/kilgallioch.aspx

Kilgallioch Wind Farm is a 96-turbine wind farm in South Ayrshire, Scotland with a total capacity of up to 239 megawatts (MW). Consent was granted by the Scottish Government in February 2013, with construction starting in 2015 and completed in 2017. The wind farm contains 70 km of internal tracks, and a surface area of roughly 32 km^{2}.

== Incidents ==
On 13 January 2017, a turbine under construction catastrophically collapsed during a storm.

On 15 March 2017, Portuguese construction worker António João Linares, who was working for turbine manufacturer Gamesa, was killed when he fell 8 metres within a tower.

== History ==
=== Project history ===
The wind farm construction was completed and began operating in 2017. ScottishPower identified an area to the south as having "excellent potential" for an extension to the site.

A meteorological mast was installed at High Eldrig in 2018 as a part of the development process, the mast was used to gather information on wind conditions at the site.

In April 2019 a scoping report was sent to the Scottish Government’s Energy Consent Unit, and in December they submitted a Section 36 (S36) Application to the Scottish Government, comprising a suite of environmental surveys to inform the design of the proposed development. In December 2020, ScottishPower submitted an Addendum (AI1) to their S36, removing the previously proposed solar arrays from the site design. Following the consultation with Historic Environment Scotland (HES) in September 2021, ScottishPower submitted another Addendum (AI2) to the S36 for authorisation to remove two wind turbines (T1 and T11) from the site design.

=== Current stage ===
Consent was granted to Scottish Power Renewables(UK) Limited (SPR) by Scottish Ministers on 8 December 2021 to construct and operate Kilgallioch Windfarm Extension. The construction consists of an electricity generating station with generation capacity of 50MW when the station is combined with the existing Kilgallioch Wind Farm, which consists of 9 wind turbines, located approximately 9.5 km north west of Kirkcowan in the authority of Dumfries and Galloway Council and South Ayrshire Council, together with the planning permission under section 57(2) of the Town & Country Planning Act (Scotland) 1997. Consent was granted for 9 turbines with the maximum height of 180m with the generating capacity of 50mw.

== See also ==
- Wind power in Scotland
- List of onshore wind farms
