= Scalasaig =

Village on the Isle of Colonsay, Scotland

Coordinates: 56.07°N 6.19°W

Scalasaig: Scottish Gaelic: Sgalasaig
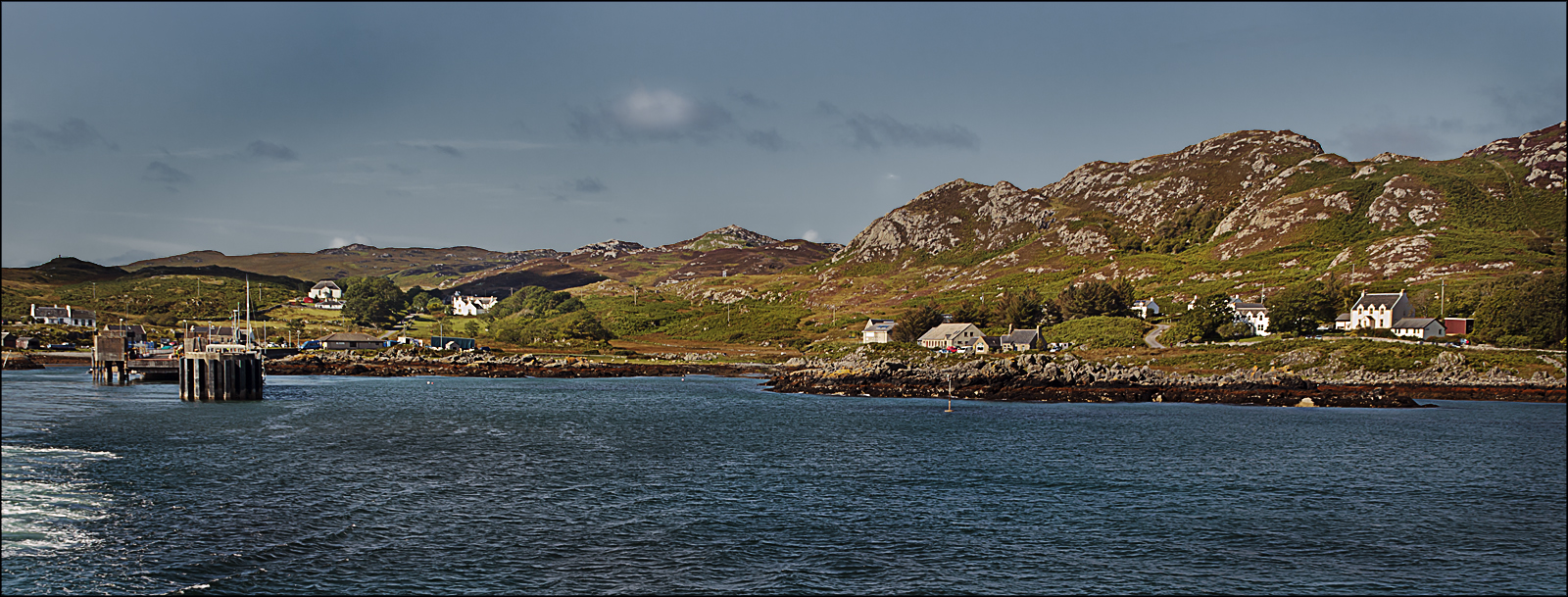

- Location within Argyll and Bute
- OS grid reference: NR394941
  - Edinburgh: 116 mi (187 km)
  - London: 400 mi (644 km)
- Council area: Argyll and Bute
- Lieutenancy area: Argyll and Bute
- Country: Scotland
- Sovereign state: United Kingdom
- Post town: ISLE OF COLONSAY
- Postcode district: PA61
- Dialling code: 01951
- Police: Scotland
- Fire: Scottish
- Ambulance: Scottish
- UK Parliament: Argyll, Bute and South Lochaber
- Scottish Parliament: Argyll and Bute

Scalasaig (Scottish Gaelic: Sgalasaig) lies on the east coast of Colonsay, in the council area of Argyll and Bute of Scotland. It is the main settlement on the island and its only port; thus tourists arriving by ferry must pass through it on the way to any part of the isle. It contains the island's shop and post office (in the same building), parish church, microbrewery, doctor's surgery, village hall, cafe and hotel/bar.

== History ==
The name "Scalasaig" is Norse and means "Skali's bay".
