= Colonsay House =

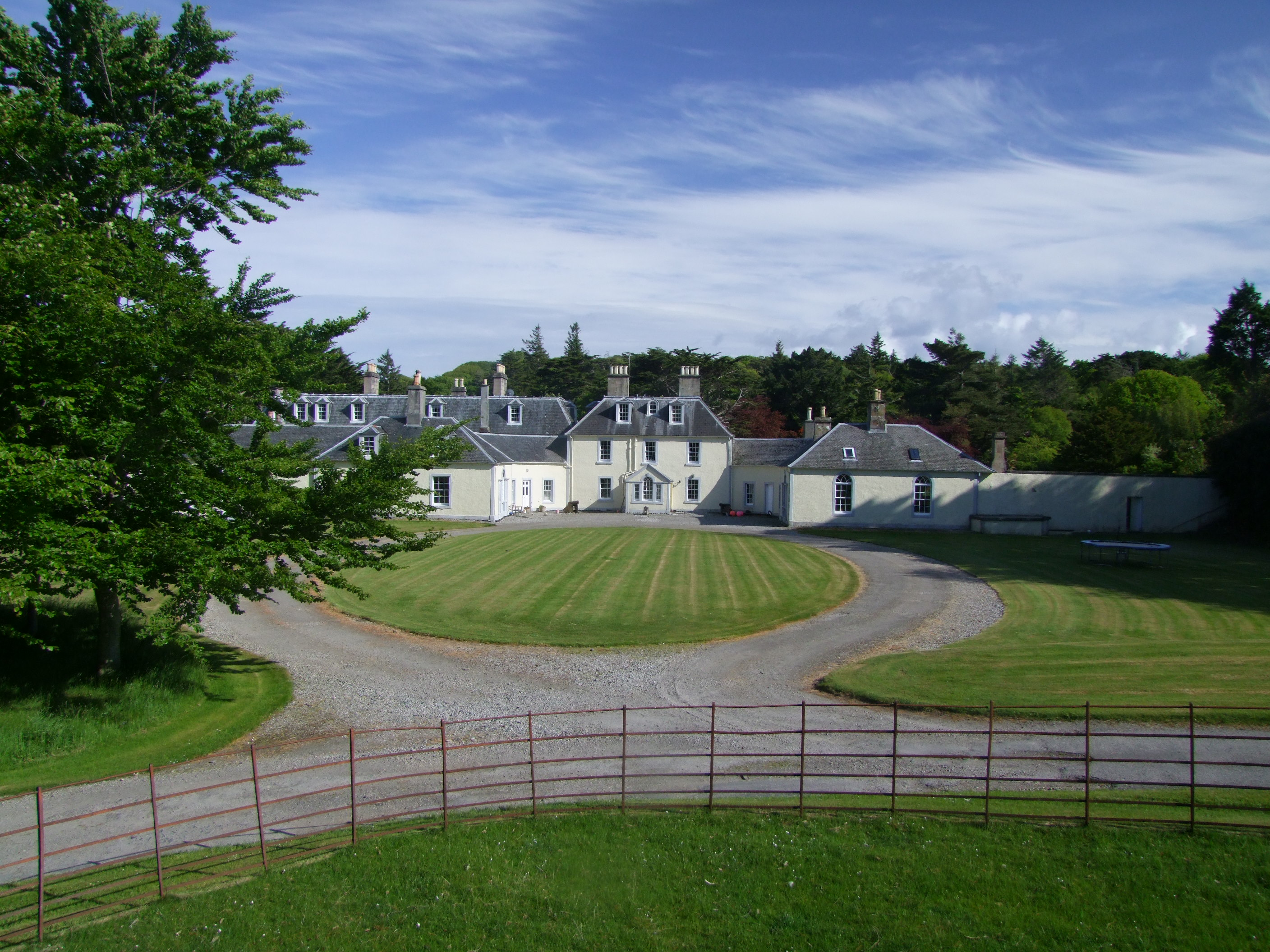
- Colonsay House
- Interactive map of the Colonsay House area

General information
- Location: Colonsay, Scotland
- Coordinates: 56°5′35″N 6°11′22″W
- Construction started: 1722

Listed Building – Category B
- Official name: Colonsay House, Kiloran
- Designated: 20 July 1971
- Reference no.: LB5082

Inventory of Gardens and Designed Landscapes in Scotland
- Official name: Colonsay House
- Designated: 30 March 2007
- Reference no.: GDL00106

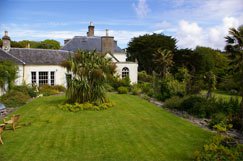
The Loggia garden at Colonsay House Gardens

Colonsay House is a Georgian country house on the island of Colonsay, in the Scottish Inner Hebrides. It is a Category B listed building, and is now in the ownership of the Barons Strathcona. The gardens are open to the public on Tuesday and Thursday afternoons between April and October, and are listed on the Inventory of Gardens and Designed Landscapes in Scotland, the national listing of historic gardens.

== Colonsay House ==
The central part of the house was built by the McNeill family in 1722. It is a medium-sized Georgian country house on the island of Colonsay, in the Inner Hebrides of Scotland. It is often said in twentieth-century sources to have been built on the site of an earlier abbey, but there is no evidence in any charter or list of Scottish monasteries of any abbey (or any other monastic foundation) having been here. Nor is there any mention in any medieval witness-list of a prior or abbot of Kiloran. The story must be considered a fable, though the church (and the island as a whole) did belong to the abbey of Iona by at least the early thirteenth century, if not before.

This is the earliest Classical House in Argyll. It has been extended twice in between 1722 and the early 20th century. Since 1904 the house has been the property of the island's owners, the Barons Strathcona, and is currently occupied by the 5th Baron and his family.

== Colonsay House Gardens ==
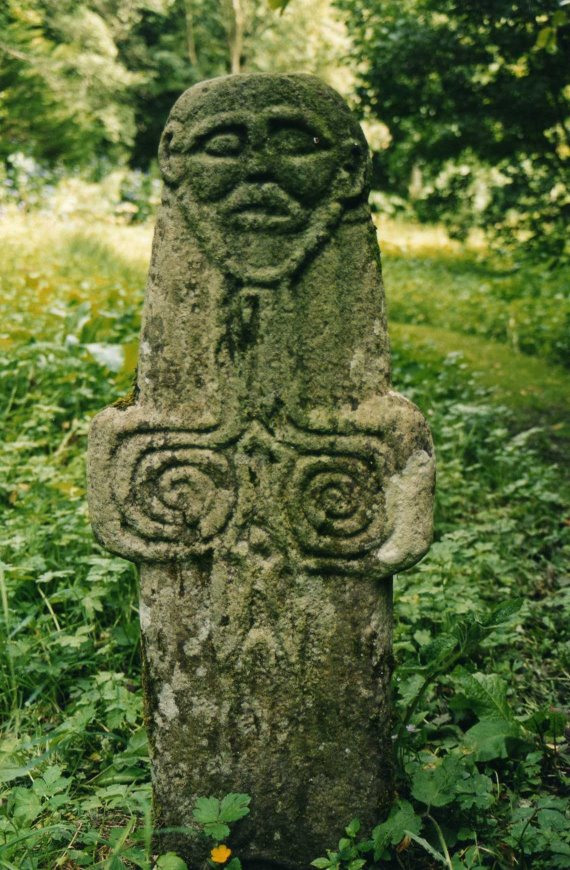
8th-century Riasg Buidhe Cross in the gardens

The house has a public rhododendron and woodland garden covering some 30 acres (12 hectares). Located centrally in the island of Colonsay, this informal woodland garden is famous for the outstanding collection of species and hybrid rhododendrons, and for unusual trees and shrubs sourced from all over the world from the 1930s. It is considered to be one of the finest rhododendron gardens in Scotland.

As the climate is mild, it is possible to grow a large variety of plants, including subtropical and more tender plants. There are eucalyptus, myrtle, acacia, eucryphia and 50-foot-tall (15 m) magnolias dotted throughout the garden. Other plants include crinodendron, the dramatic flame red embothrium, gunnera and cordyline, giving the gardens a subtropical feel. In spring, paths are lined with Himalayan primula, bluebells and other wild flowers. The walled gardens and rolling lawns are more formal. A Dicksonia antarctica stands among lomatia, crinodendron and camellia. Abutilon, olearia and, later in the year, eucryphia, flower profusely alongside enormous Cupressus macrocarpa.

The island's mill used to stand in the spot which is now The Dell garden. An 8th-century cross (a hybrid phallic and early Christian form) from the abandoned village of Riasg Buidhe stands below the house. A focal point is the Lighthouse Garden, featuring the Fresnel lens from Islay. The Old Workshop cafe in the gardens was built for the 4th Lord Strathcona by his father around 1935.

== Gallery ==
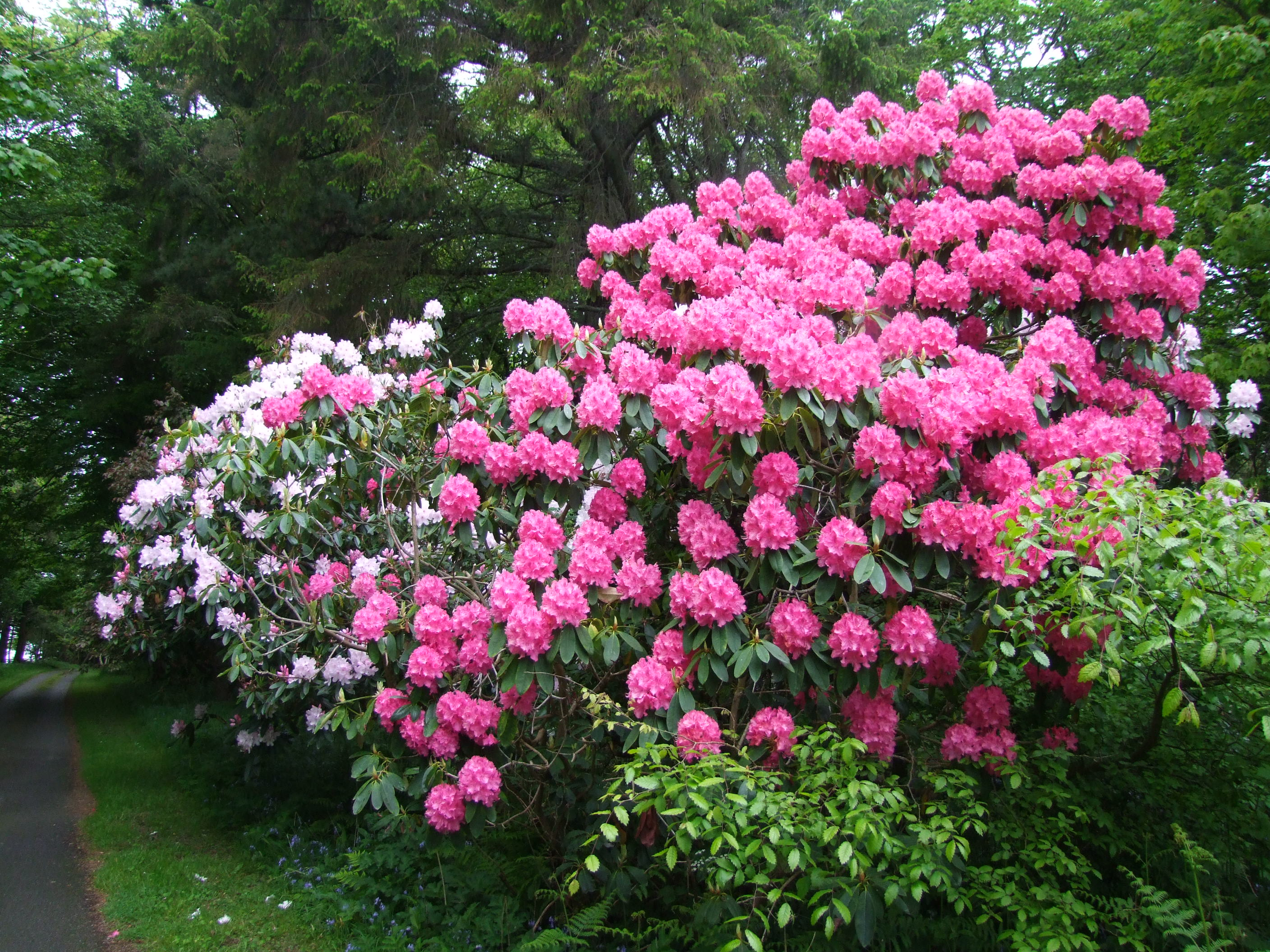
Rhododendrons, Colonsay House Drive

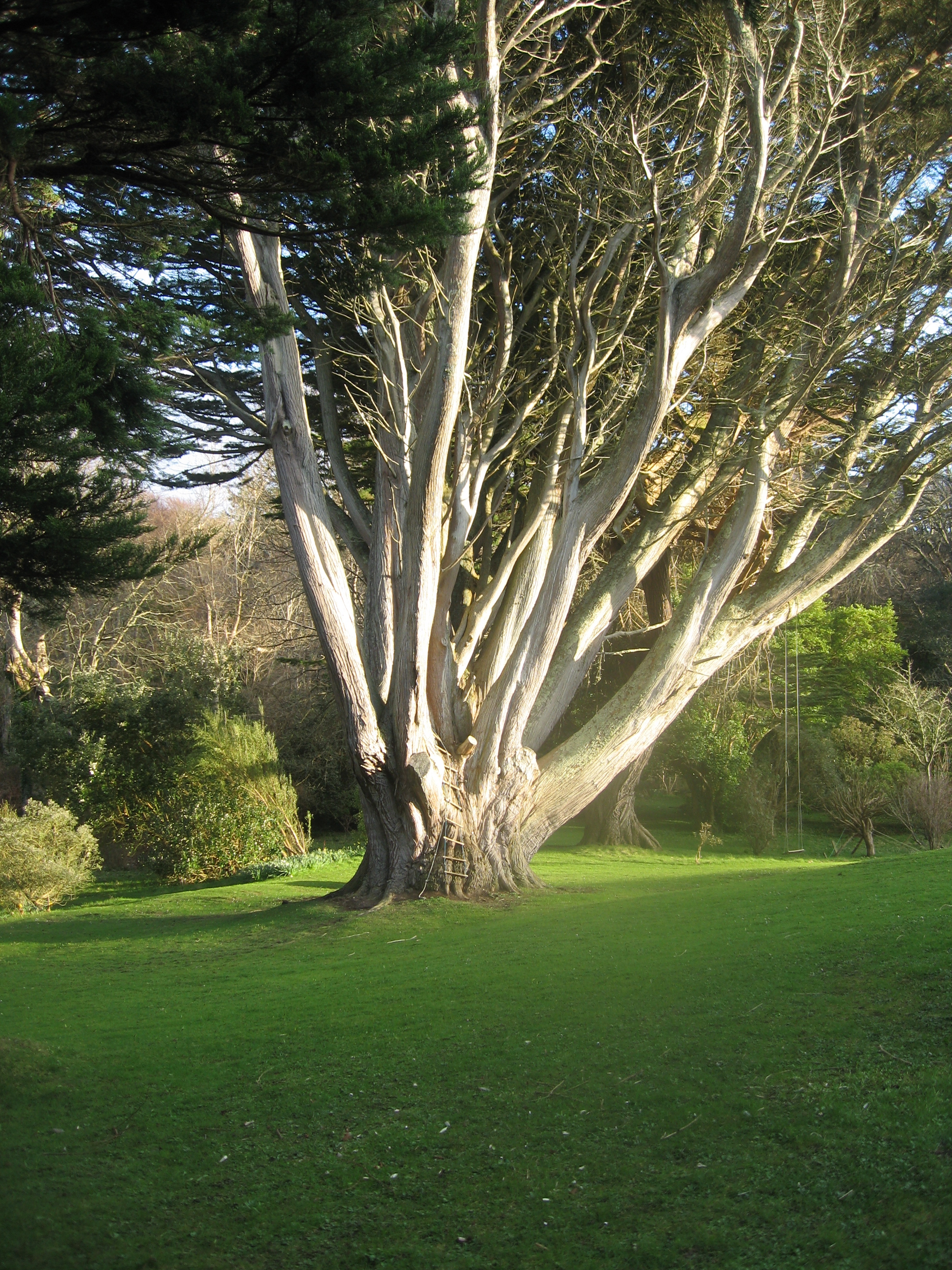
Cupressus macrocarpa

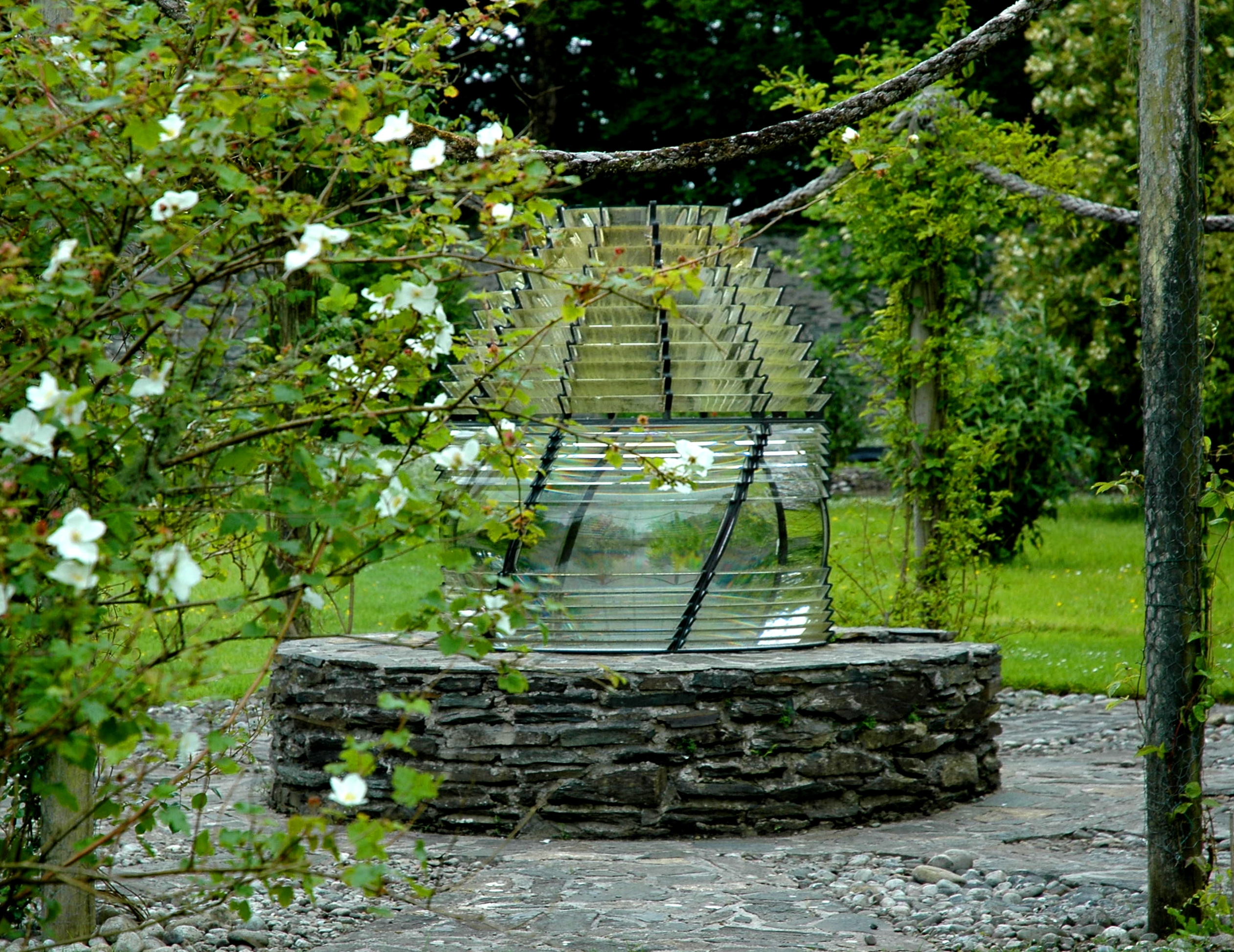
The Fresnel lens from Islay now makes a focal point in the old kitchen gardens at Colonsay House Gardens

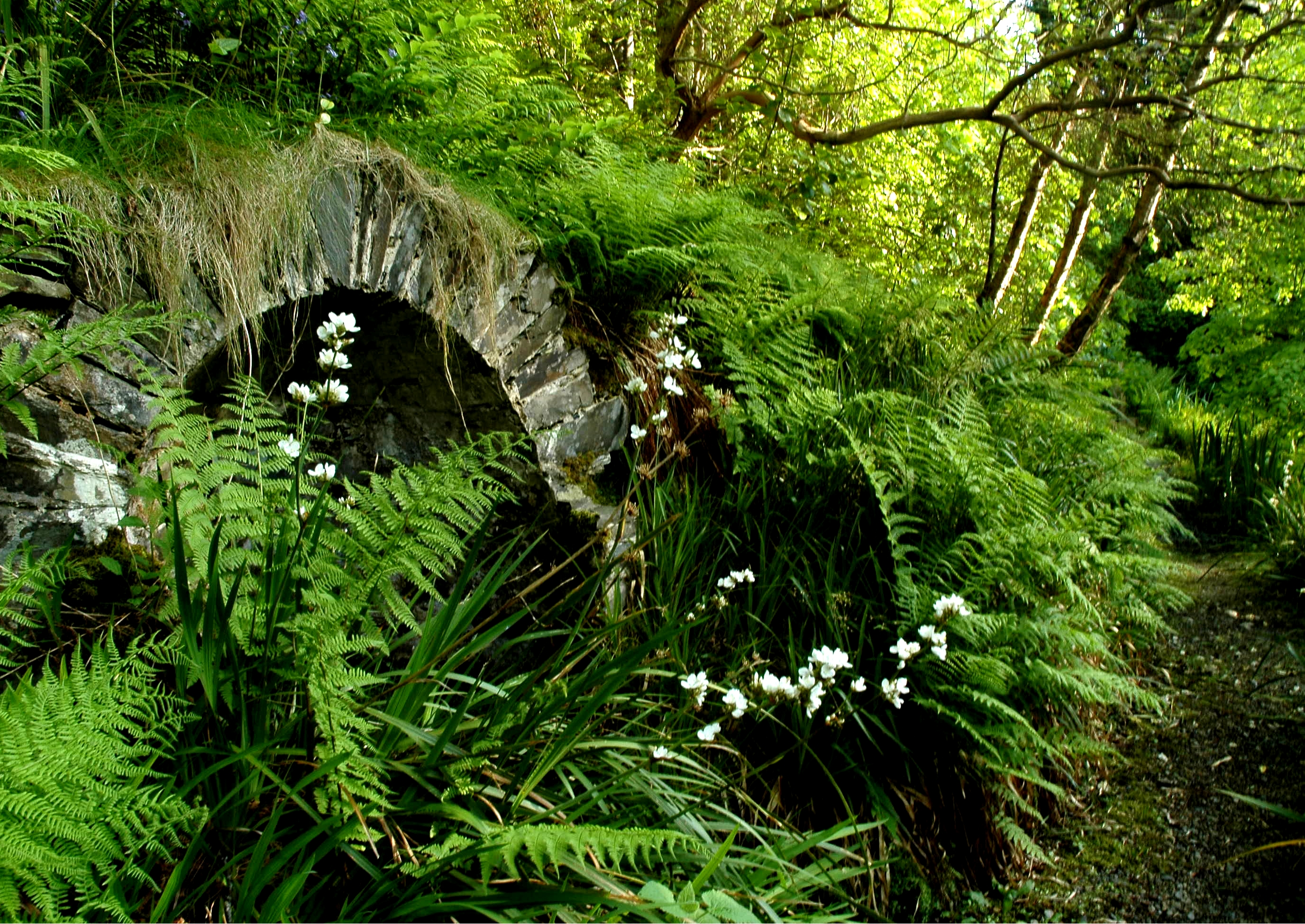
Libertia and the grotto, The Dell Garden
