= Macfie =

Macfie or MacFie is a surname of Scottish origin. The name is derived from the Gaelic Mac Dhuibhshíthe, which means "son of Duibhshíth" (or alternately MacDhubhshith, "son of Dubhshithe"). This Gaelic personal name is composed of two elements: dubh "black" + síth "peace". The earliest record of the surname is of Thomas Macdoffy, in 1296.

== Uses of the name ==
=== People ===
- Allan Macfie (1854–1943), Scottish amateur golfer
- Charles Maitland MacFie (1872–1961), farmer and politician in Ontario, Canada
- Harry Macfie (1879–1956), Swedish adventurer, writer and businessman
- John McPhee (born 1931 ), Scottish American author
- Rebecca Macfie, New Zealand author and journalist
- Robert Andrew Macfie (1811–1893), Scottish businessman and Member of Parliament
- Robert Macfie Thorburn (1828–1896), Swedish-Scots businessman and Swedish politician
- Senga Macfie (born 1968), English-born Scottish former professional squash player

=== Other ===
- Clan Macfie, Scottish clan historically located on the island of Colonsay in the Hebrides
