= Mahaffey =

Mahaffey is a surname of Scottish origin, and is an Anglicisation of the Gaelic name Mac Dhuibhshithe. It is a sept of Clan Macfie in Scotland, but the clan originated in Ireland. There the name is found largely in County Donegal, Ulster.

People with the surname Mahaffey include:

- Art Mahaffey (born 1938), American athlete
- Audley F. Mahaffey (1899–1982), American politician
- Fred K. Mahaffey (1934–1986), American military officer
- Jim Mahaffey (1936–2020), American bridge player
- John Mahaffey (born 1948), American golfer
- Maryann Mahaffey (1925–2006), American politician
- Matt Mahaffey (born 1973), American musician
- Mike Mahaffey (1967–2005), American musician
- Randolph Mahaffey (born 1945), American basketball player
- Roy Mahaffey (1904–1969), American baseball player
- Valerie Mahaffey (1953–2025), Indonesian-American actress

== See also ==
- Mahaffy, a variant of the surname
