= Mehaffey =

Mehaffey is a surname. Notable people with the surname include:

- Blanche Mehaffey (1903–1968), American showgirl and film actress
- Carolyn Mehaffey (fl. 1980s), American rower
- Catherine Mehaffey (fl. 1970s–2000s), American attorney and crime suspect
- James Mehaffey (1931–2020), Bishop of Derry and Raphoe of the Church of Ireland
- Joseph Cowles Mehaffey (1889–1963), American military officer and engineer
- Olivia Mehaffey (born 1998), professional golfer from Northern Ireland

== See also ==
- Mehaffey House, historic house in Little Rock, Arkansas
- Clan Macfie, Scottish clan of which Mehaffey is a sept
- Tom Mehaffie (born 1971), American politician
- Mehaffy, a surname
