= Oronsay, Colonsay =

Small tidal island south of Colonsay in the Scottish Inner Hebrides

Oronsay
Orasaigh (Gaelic)
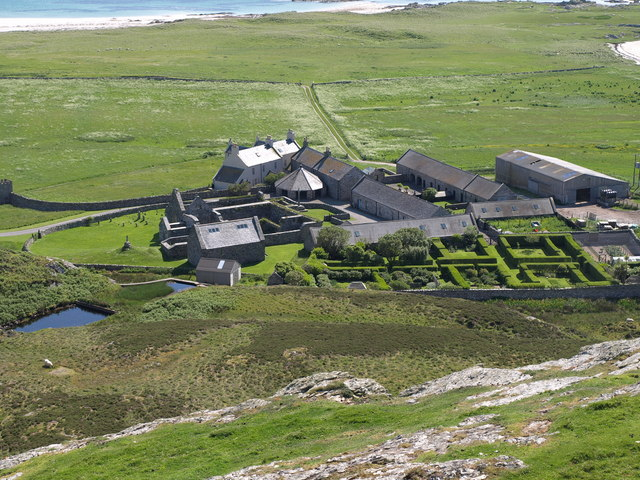
- Oronsay Priory and Farm

Location
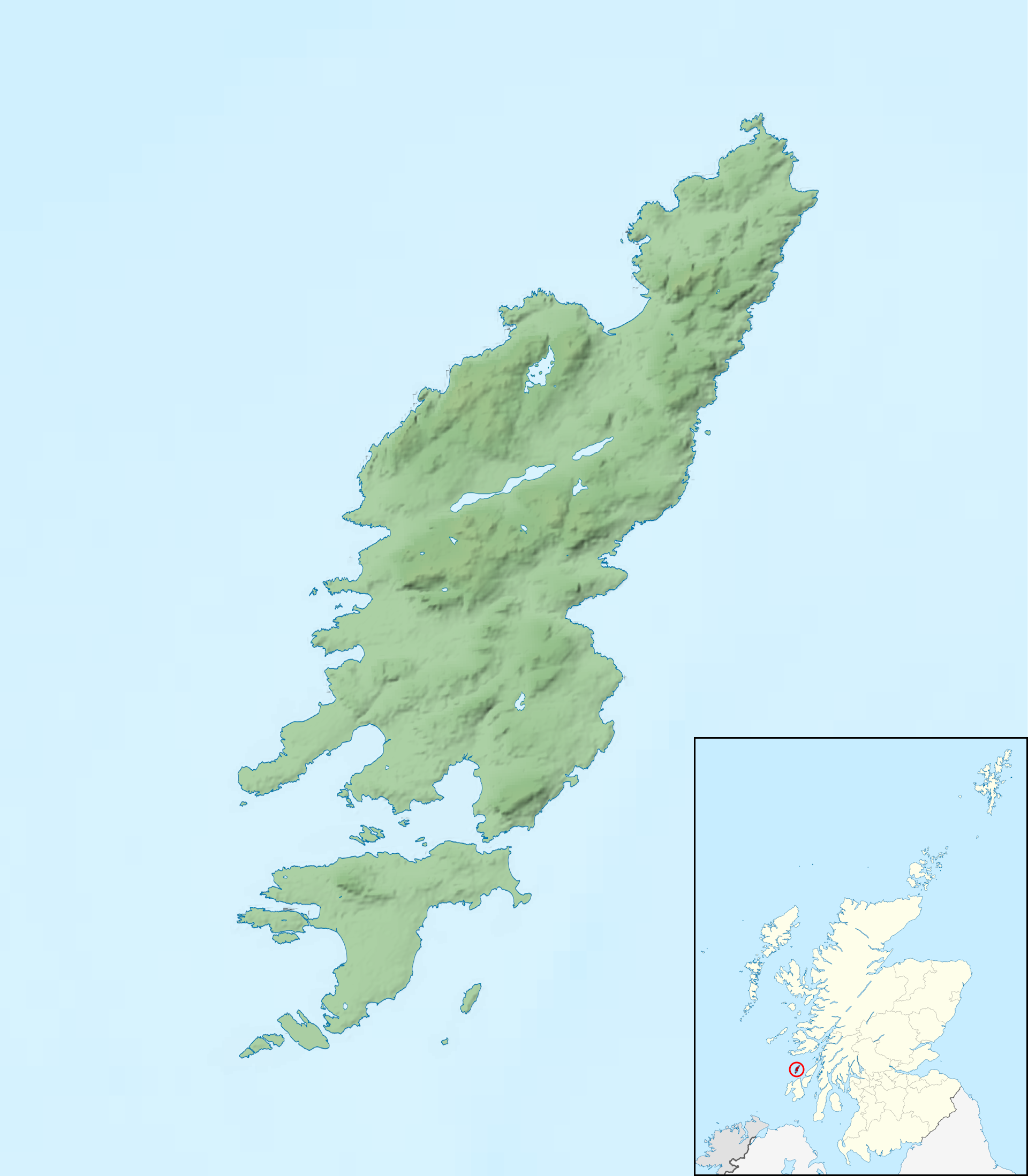
- Oronsay shown next to Colonsay Oronsay shown within Argyll and Bute Oronsay shown within Scotland
- OS grid reference: NR351892
- Coordinates: 56.02°N 6.24°W

Name
- Gaelic pronunciation: [ˈɔɾəs̪aj]
- Name meaning: "tidal island" or "Oran's isle"
- Old Norse name: [possibly] Örfirisey

Physical geography
- Island group: Inner Hebrides
- Area: 543 ha (1,340 acres)
- Area rank: 71
- Highest elevation: Beinn Orasaigh, 93 m (305 ft)

Administration
- Council area: Argyll and Bute
- Country: Scotland
- Sovereign state: United Kingdom

Demographics
- Population: 8
- Population rank: 72=
- Population density: 1.3/km^{2} (3.4/sq mi)
- Largest settlement: Oronsay Farm

Oronsay (Note: Scottish Gaelic: Orasaigh), also sometimes spelt and pronounced Oransay by the local community, is a small tidal island south of Colonsay in the Scottish Inner Hebrides with an area of 543 hectares (1,340 acres). (Note: The Gazetteer for Scotland records the area as 519 hectares.)

The island rises to a height of 93 metres (305 feet) at Beinn Orasaigh and is linked to Colonsay by a tidal causeway called An Tràigh (The Strand) consisting of sands and mud flats. In the 2001 census Oronsay was recorded as having a population of five people, who lived at the farm adjacent to Oronsay Priory. In 2022 the population was seven. The island has no facilities for visitors and is now privately owned, with the RSPB farming the island for the American owner. It is dependent upon tidal access to and from Colonsay. There is a small grass air strip south of the priory that "fights a losing battle with the rabbits".

== Etymology ==
There are two theories for the origin of the name from Old Norse. Either it is Oran's Isle, St Oran being imagined as the founder of the island's original monastery in 563, (Murray (1966) states that the original Gaelic name was Eilean Orain) or it may be from the Old Norse Örfirisey meaning "island of the ebb tide".

== Prehistory ==
Both Oronsay and neighbouring Colonsay have furnished archaeologists with invaluable information about the Mesolithic period of prehistory, particularly about the diet of human beings. Three middens on Oronsay were opened in the 1880s and have provided a piece of bone carbon-dated to 4600 BC and an oyster shell to 3065 BC. Evidence provided from saithe bones in the middens suggest that the local population lived there all year round and were heavily reliant on marine protein. Site datings on Colonsay and Islay suggest an absence of human habitation in the area from c. 5250–4750 BC for unknown reasons.

There is comparatively little evidence for life during the Neolithic and Bronze Ages although a picture emerges of "small farming communities and changes in technology occurring slowly over a long period of time" on Colonsay and environs. By the close of the Iron Age around 500 AD Colonsay and Oronsay were part of the Gaelic-speaking Kingdom of Dál Riata although which of the main Dalriadan kindreds controlled them is unknown. The founding of the fort of Dùn Eibhinn on Colonsay that overlooks Oronsay dates from this period.

== Religious history ==
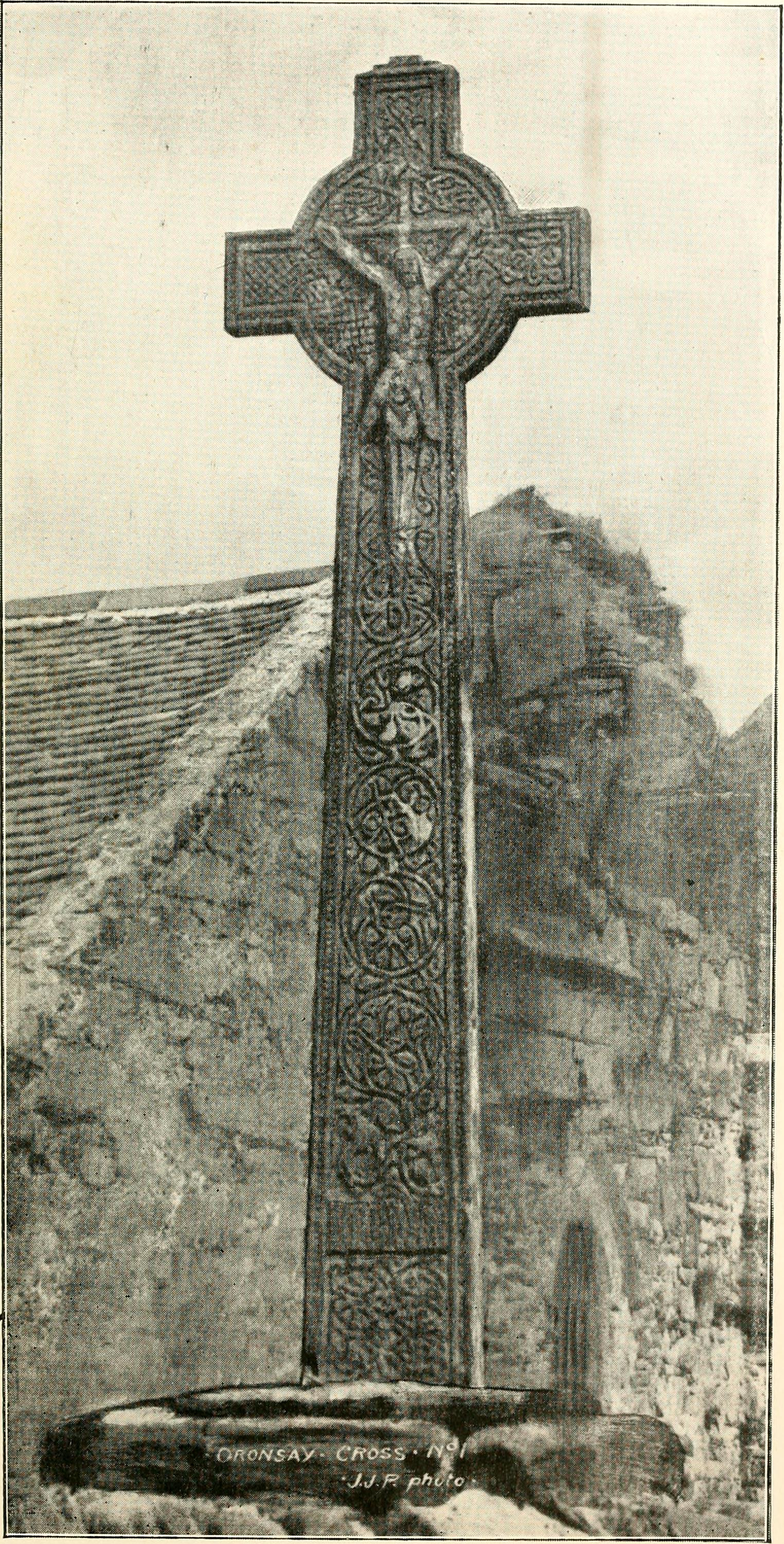
Cross No. 1 on Oronsay

Watson (2004) mentions Oronsay as a possible candidate for the site of Hinba, an island in Scotland of uncertain location that was the site of a small monastery associated with the Columban church on Iona.

The site of a Norse ship burial has been found on Oronsay and another on Colonsay dated to the mid 9th century at which point these islands were likely part of the far-flung Kingdom of the Isles. Following the 1266 Treaty of Perth the Hebrides were yielded to the Kingdom of Scotland and the Gaelic language re-asserted its dominant position in the southern Hebrides.

Oronsay also had a medieval Augustinian priory, the ruins of which are still extant. It was built c. 1380, possibly on the site of an earlier church (for whose existence there is actually no surviving evidence), perhaps founded by John of Islay, Lord of the Isles. By the early 16th century a distinct 'school' of monumental sculpture flourished on Oronsay. Two substantial celtic crosses sit outside the perimeter of the buildings and many slabs with effigies or other carvings are still to be found within the priory itself.

== 16th-18th centuries ==
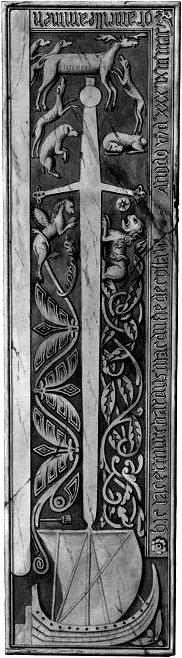
Tomb of Murchardus Macdufie, who died in 1539. (Note: This image was drawn by John Cleveley, junior, from a sketch taken on 8 August 1772. On the back of the drawing is the quotation given above, presumably made by Sir Joseph Banks who travelled to the Western Isles around 1772.)

On a visit to Colonsay in the 18th century, Sir Joseph Banks was informed that Murchardus Macdufie (d. 1539) "was a factor or manager for Macdonald King of the Isles upon these islands of Oransay and Colonsay & that for his mismanagement & tyranny he was executed by order of that prince".

According to Caldwell (2011) "the medieval period on Islay, Jura and Colonsay was a cultural high point" but the last known Prior of Oronsay was Robert Lamont, elected in 1555. After the Scottish Reformation in 1560, the lands and property of the priory was given in commendam to Maol Choluim MacDubhthaich (Malcolm MacDuffie), at which time it would appear that the community ceased to exist. The MacDuffies based their operations at the site of the old Dalriadan fort of Dun Eibhinn.

Writing in 1549, Sir Donald Monro, High Dean of the Isles stated of "Orvansay" that it was a low-lying island with "ane Monasterie of Channonis" and "full of hares and polecats, with a good anchorage for Highland galleys and shallow waters". (Note: Monro wrote in Scots. The original is "mane laich land, full of hairis and fowmartis, with gude heavin for hieland Galays and scheald at the schoiris".) In 1596 a report about the military strength of the Lords of the Isles indicated that Colonsay and Oronsay together maintained a contingent of 100 warriors who were not required to work the land.

By the early 17th century land on Colonsay was held by both Clan Macfie and Clan MacDonald of Dunnyveg. In 1623 Coll Ciotach (Colkitto), a Dunnyveg mercenary, was charged with the murder of Malcolm MacFie. MacFie had been hiding on Eilean nan Ròn (an islet south-west of Oronsay) but he was spotted there by Colkitto's men, apprehended and then tied to a stone and summarily shot. However, after the death of their chief, the MacFies lost control of their lands and by 1630 Colkitto held the whole of Colonsay and Oronsay from the Campbell Earl of Argyll. However, not long after this Colkitto lost his own life in the Wars of the Three Kingdoms and by 1701 the Campbells had sold both islands to a MacNeill of Knapdale, whose family held these lands until the early 20th century.

Martin Martin observed in a 1703 publication that Oronsay:

is four miles [6 km] in circumference, being for the most part a plain arable, dry, sandy soil, and is fruitful in corn and grass; it is likewise adorned with a church, chapel, and monastery... There are several burying-places here, and the tombstones for the most part have a two-handed sword engraven on them. On the south side of the church within lie the tombs of MacDuffie and of the cadets of his family; there is a ship under sail and a two-handed sword engraven on the principal tombstone and this inscription, Hic jacit Malcolumbus MacDuffie de Collonsay; his coat of arms and colour-staff is of red in a stone, through which a hole is made to hold it. There is a cross at the east and west sides of this church, which are now broken; their height was about 12 feet [3.7 m] each; there is a large cross on the west side of the church, of an entire stone very hard; there is a pedestal of three steps, by which they ascend to it, it is 16 feet [5 m] high, and a foot and a half [0.5 m] broad; there is a large crucifix on the west side of this cross, it has an inscription underneath, but not legible, being almost worn off by the injury of time; the other side has a tree engraven on it... The natives of Colonsay are accustomed, after their arrival in Oronsay Isle, to make a tour sunways about the church, before they enter upon any kind of business.

— Martin Martin, A Description of The Western Islands of Scotland.

The island is now owned by the Colburn family.

== Wildlife ==
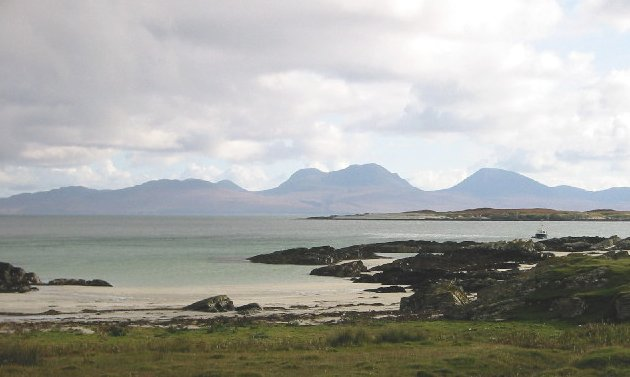
From one of the small beaches on the east coast of Oronsay, looking towards the Paps of Jura in the distance

The rocks and skerries of Eilean nan Ròn (Seal Island), to the south-west, are an important grey seal breeding colony. The islet has a ruined house, possibly once used by a kelp gatherer and used for sheep grazing in the summer, the rocks being fertilised by the winter-visiting barnacle geese. Dean Munro also mentioned the nearby islet of Eilean Ghaoideamal under its earlier name of Ellan na muk, noting that it was "gude for swine and uther bestiall".

In order to conserve the population of resident choughs and breeding corncrakes Oronsay and southern Colonsay became a Special Protection Area in December 2007.

Colonsay and Oronsay are home to about 50 colonies of the European dark bee the Apis mellifera mellifera. The Scottish Government introduced the Bee Keeping (Colonsay and Oronsay) Order 2013 to prevent cross breeding with other honeybees (Apis mellifera) and to protect it from diseases common on the mainland. From 1 January 2014 it has been an offence to keep any other honeybee on either island. The Environment and climate Change Minister Paul Wheelhouse MSP said: "The Bee Keeping Order illustrates how our non-native species legislation can be used to protect our native wildlife. The order is a targeted measure to protect an important population of black bees on Colonsay from hybridisation with non-native bees" (the "non-native species legislation" was used because Apis mellifera are considered to be non-native to Colonsay, but considered native to Scotland as it was the first honey bee to be introduced for use in beekeeping there). The bees on Colonsay are now referred to as the "Colonsay Dark Native Bee". They were collected from across Scotland in the previous thirty years, genetic analysis has shown Australian and New Zealand A. m. ligustica introgression.

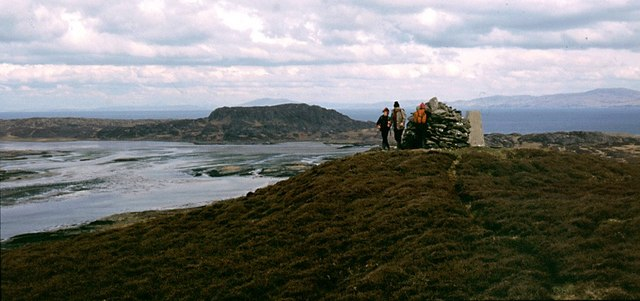
The summit of Beinn Orasaigh with Beinn Eibhne on Colonsay beyond.

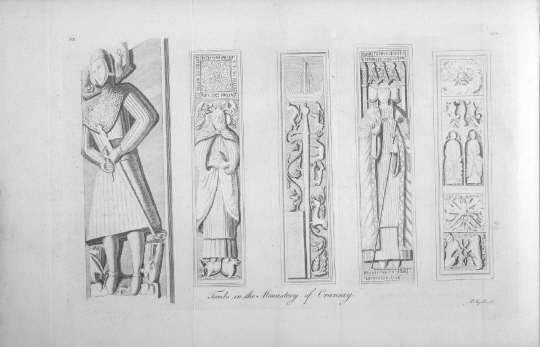
Tombs on Oronsay

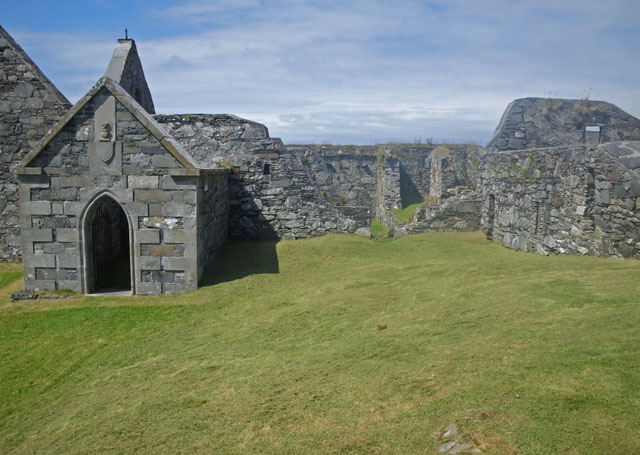
Oronsay Priory was improved in anticipation of Queen Elizabeth's visit.

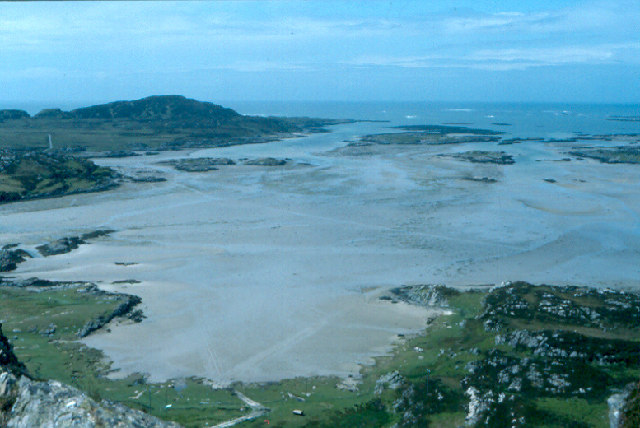
The Strand looking west with Oronsay at left

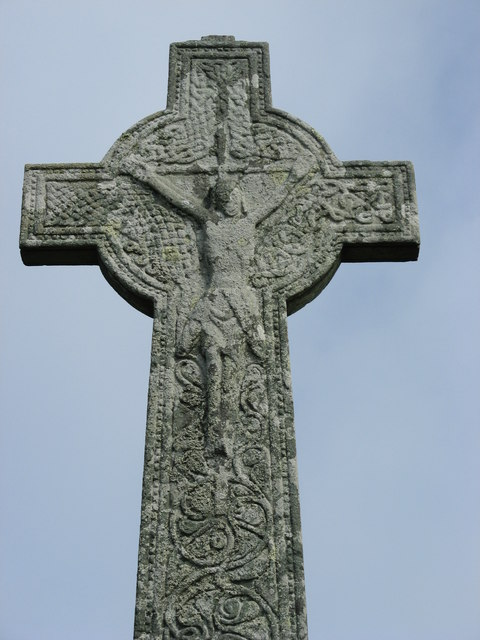
Oronsay cross

== See also ==
- List of islands of Scotland

== References and footnotes ==
Notes

Footnotes

General references

- Caldwell, David H. (2011). Islay, Jura and Colonsay: A Historical Guide. Edinburgh: Birlinn. ISBN 978-1-84158-961-9.
- Haswell-Smith, Hamish (2004). The Scottish Islands. Edinburgh: Canongate. ISBN 978-1-84195-454-7.
- Jennings, Andrew; Kruse, Arne (2009). "From Dál Riata to the Gall-Ghàidheil". Viking and Medieval Scandinavia. 5: 123–149. doi:10.1484/J.VMS.1.100676. hdl:20.500.11820/762e78fe-2a9c-43cf-8173-8300892b31cb.
- Mac an Tàilleir, Iain (2003) Goireasan Cànain / Language Resources - Tadhail is Ionnsaich : Pàrlamaid na h-Alba. (pdf) Pàrlamaid na h-Alba. Retrieved 26 October 2025.
- Martin, Martin (1703). "A Description of The Western Islands of Scotland". Appin Regiment/Appin Historical Society. Archived from the original on 13 March 2007. First printed for Andrew Bell and others, London.
- Moncreiffe of that Ilk, Iain (1967). The Highland Clans. London: Barrie & Rocklif.
- Monro, Sir Donald (1549) Description of the Western Isles of Scotland. William Auld. Edinburgh - 1774 edition.
- Munro, R. W. (1961) Monro's Western Isles of Scotland and Genealogies of the Clans. Edinburgh and London. Oliver and Boyd.
- Murray, W. H. (1966). The Hebrides. London: Heinemann.
- Murray, W.H. (1973) The Islands of Western Scotland: the Inner and Outer Hebrides. London. Eyre Methuen. ISBN 0413303802
- Omand, Donald (ed.) (2006) The Argyll Book. Edinburgh. Birlinn. ISBN 978-1-84158-480-5
- Watt, D.E.R. & Shead, N.F. (eds.) (2001) The Heads of Religious Houses in Scotland from the 12th to the 16th Centuries, The Scottish Records Society, New Series, Volume 24. Edinburgh.
- Watson, W.J. (2004) The History of the Celtic Place-names of Scotland. Reprinted with an introduction by Simon Taylor. Edinburgh. Birlinn. ISBN 1-84158-323-5. First published 1926.
