= Prior of Oronsay =

The Prior of Oronsay was the Religious Superior of Oronsay Priory, a community of canons regular on the island of Oronsay, Inner Hebrides, off the coast of Scotland. It was in existence by 1353, perhaps founded by John of Islay, Lord of the Isles.

It is probable that most of the priors have not come down to us by name. The last known prior was Robert Lamont, elected in 1555. After the Scottish Reformation in 1560, the lands and property of the priory was given in commendam to Maol Choluim MacDubhthaich ("Malcolm MacDuffie"), at which time it would appear that the community ceased to exist.

The property was later given to the Bishop of the Isles by King James VI of Scotland upon his ascendency to the throne in 1583.

== List of priors and commendators ==
=== List of known priors ===
- ???, fl. 1353
- Martin, x 1362
- Maurice de Oronsay, 1362-1382 x 1396
- Domhnall MacMhuirich, 1397–1426
- Dúghall MacEain (Dugall McKane), 1426–1472
- Dúghall MacDomhnaill (Donaldi), 1472
- Domhnall "Macyroull", 1499
- Domhnall MacPháil, 1538
- Domhnall MacDubhtaich (Donald MacDuffie or MacFee), 1538–1554
- Eoin MacMhuirich, 1554–1558
- Robert Lamont, 1555

=== List of known commendators ===
- Maol Choluim MacDubhthaich (Malcolm MacDuffie or Macilfie), 1561–1583

== See also ==
- Oronsay Priory
