= Lysekil =

- From the top, left to right: Lysekil skyline, the Gentry Salon, Gamlestan, Pinnevik beach, Lysekil church, and the Town Park.

- Location within Västra Götaland Location within Sweden
- Coordinates: 58°16′39″N 11°26′33″E
- Country: Sweden
- Province: Bohuslän
- County: Västra Götaland County
- Municipality: Lysekil Municipality

Area
  - Total: 3.75 km^{2} (1.45 sq mi)

Population (1 December 2022)
  - Total: about 8,000
  - Density: 2,032/km^{2} (5,260/sq mi)
- Time zone: UTC+1 (CET)
  - Summer (DST): UTC+2 (CEST)
- Website: www.lysekil.se

Lysekil (Swedish pronunciation: [ˈlŷːsɛˌɕiːl]) is a locality and the seat of Lysekil Municipality in Västra Götaland County, Sweden. It had about 7,600 inhabitants in 2018. Situated on the south tip of Stångenäs peninsula at the mouth of Gullmarn fjord, it has two nature reserves.

Originally a small fishing village, it developed into a town for fishing industries, commercial shipping and trade during the 18th and 19th centuries. Stone industry based on the red Bohus granite from quarries in the town, was also vital to Lysekil up until the 1950s. One of Sweden's largest oil refineries, Preemraff Lysekil is situated outside the town.

During the 19th century, Lysekil was established as a prominent spa and bathing resort and tourism still makes up a large part of the town's economy.

== History ==
Lysekil is first mentioned in 1570. It was originally an estate belonging to Lyse farm further inland. The population lived mostly on fishing and commercial shipping. The first settlement was on the north side on the tip of Stångenäs peninsula, where a natural, sheltered harbor is formed by a bay in Kornö fjord. The area is known today as North Harbour (Norra Hamnen). Before fixed lighthousees were built in the area, the local inhabitants would light false beacon fires, causing ships to run aground. Pillaging wrecks and also killing sailors who defended their stranded ships, was common along the coastline. During the Great Northern War (1700–1721), Lysekil was one of the harbors along the Swedish west coast where privateering became sanctioned by the government through the issuing of letters of marque. Charles XII of Sweden needed ships and men for the navy and one of the ways to get this was to give private ships and captains permission to seize and capture enemy ships and their crews.

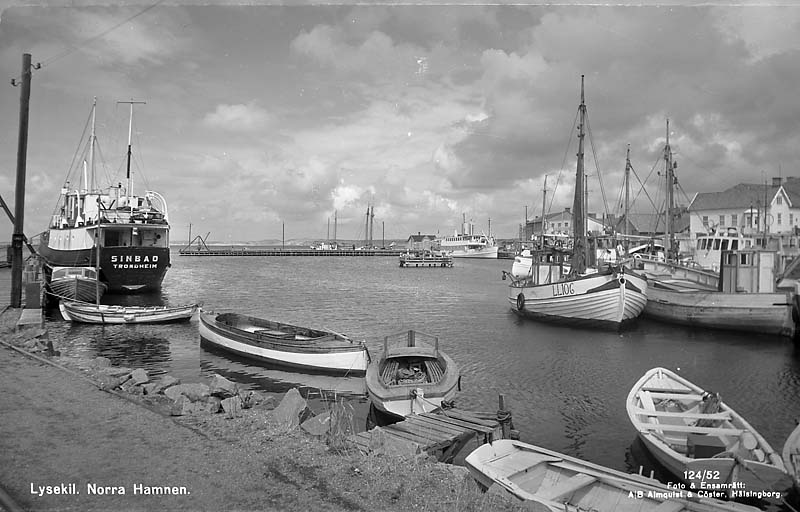
North Harbor in 1920–30

When herring fishing peaked after 1750, fishing industries flourished in Lysekil. The main export products were salted herring and train oil made from boiled herring to extract the oil. During the Age of Sail, Lysekil became a center for fishing, shipping and transport. At the mid 1800s, the fishing village had a number of sailing ships. In 1909, 18 large sailing ships and 10 steamboats were registered in Lysekil. The harbor records that same year show 6,832 ships, including 185 foreign, coming and leaving.

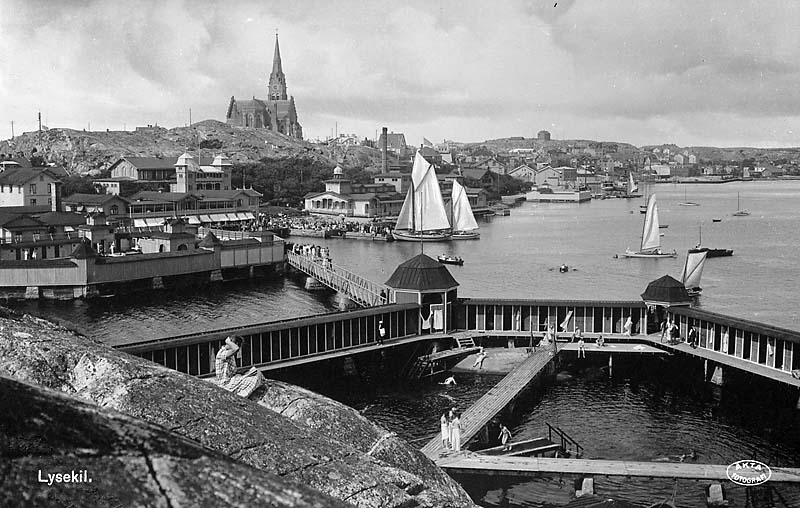
Lysekil bath houses circa 1920–30

During the second part of the 1800s, Lysekil developed into a bathing resort. The first warm water bath house was made from the cabin of a ship and the first real house was built in 1849. In 1859, Carl Curman became resident physician at the resort. He had studied the climate along the west coast and found Lysekil to be best suited for a spa town and through his contacts, the town became a resort favoured by the Stockholm socialite. New bathhouses, hotels and parks were built in 1864–1890 along the south side of the town, now known as the South Harbor (Södra Hamnen). Among those were the two Curman Villas built in Dragestil.

During World War II was one of the ports involved in Operation Bridford during which fast ships, called "Blockade runners", could break through the German Skagerrak mine blockade and ship ball bearings to Kingston upon Hull, England. The same route was later used to bring supplies and ammunition from Britain to the Danish resistance movement.

On 19 August 1961, the only collision between a car and a submarine recorded in history happened in Lysekil.

== Geography ==
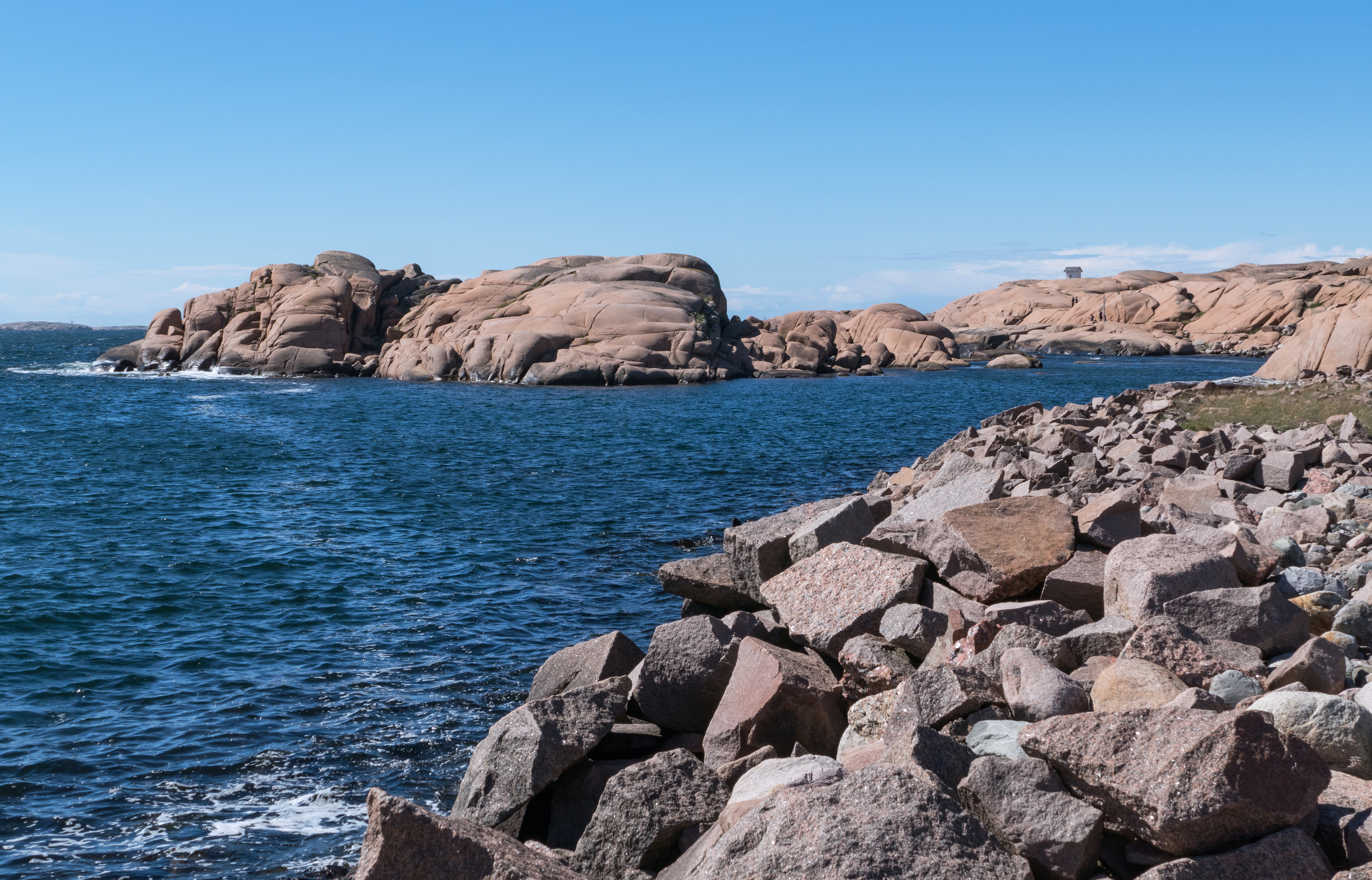
Red granite cliffs in Stångehuvud

Lysekil is situated on the south tip of the Stångenäs peninsula on the Swedish west coast at the mouth of Gullmarn fjord. The town is surrounded on three sides by the sea and a number of islands and islets. The largest islands are Stora and Lilla Skeppsholmen, Skälholmarna, Valboholmen, Humlesäcken, Stångholmen, Släggö, Grötö, and Tova.

Lysekil is surrounded by harbors, piers, boardwalks and quays on all sides facing the sea. The two main harbors are North Harbor and South Harbor. At the North Harbor, the original small wooden cottages and houses from the first settlement, Gamlestan (Old Town), have been restored and rebuilt into a picturesque part of the town. Both the north and the south harbors have guest harbors as well as plenty of restaurants and cafés.

=== Nature reserves ===
There are two nature reserves in Lysekil, Stångehuvud and Gullmarn fjord. The red granite cliffs of Stångehuvud were bought for conservation purpose in 1920 by Calla Curman and in 1982, the area was established as a nature reserve. The cliffs make up the southwest end of Stångenäs peninsula. In 1983, Gullmarn fjord was designated as Sweden's first marine conservation area.

== Economy ==
Starting out as a small fishing village, Lysekil developed into a place for fishing industry and refined fish products. Large amounts of train oil were also produced and exported to European countries as well as New York to be used in street lamps. At the beginning of the 20th century, there were around 40 factories in Lysekil. In 1893, Arvid Bernhard Öhnberg started the A. B. Öhnberg Canning Company which included the Ejderns brand, all now owned by Abba Seafood. They produced a special sort of caviar that is still one of the most popular sandwich spreads in Sweden. Lysekil Caviar, often referred to as creamed smoked roe, differs from normal caviar in that its main ingredients are cod roe, canola oil, sugar, onion, tomato sauce and salt; it is also often seasoned with dill. Kalles Kaviar is the best-known brand.

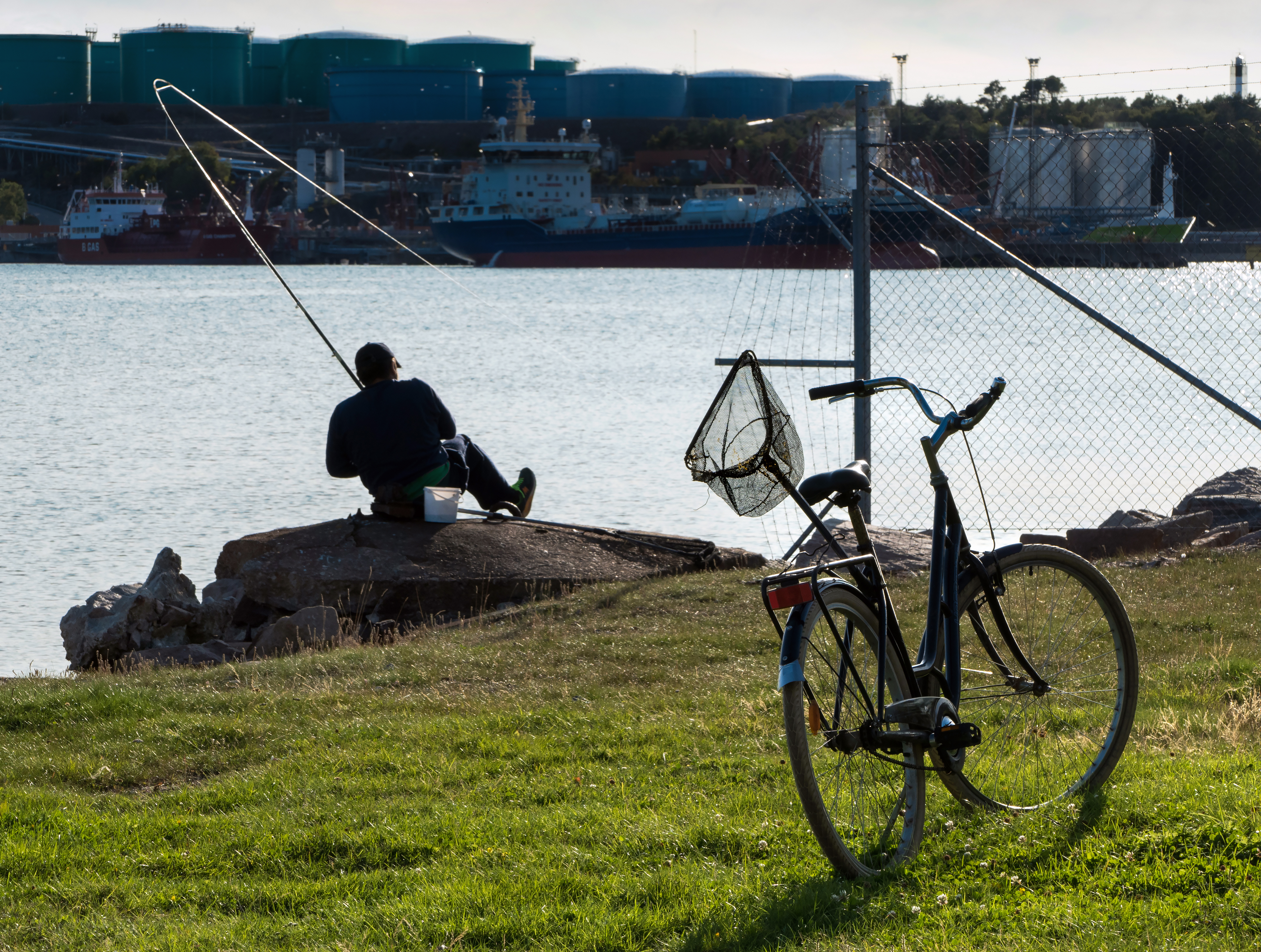
A man fishing at the old quarry in Lahälla, opposite Preemraff refinery

Granite quarries and stonemasonry were part of Lysekil's industries in 1850–1950. The granite was much in demand for buildings and street paving in Britain, Germany, Denmark, Belgium and Argentine. In 1909, there were five quarries in Lysekil.

Tourism became a vital source of income for Lysekil in the 1850s. The town was established as a fashionable bathing resort. In 2018, tourism is still vital for the town's economy. It has branched out to include more activities underwater diving, kayaking, sports fishing and seal safaris.

One of the largest oil refinery in Sweden, Preemraff Lysekil, situated a few miles outside the town, is one of the main employers in the area. Plans to build a refinery near Lysekil started in 1945 when the Swedish consumer-owned oil company Oljekonsumenters Riksförbund (OK), was formed. Negotiations for building the refinery were long and hard, and it was not until 1975 that it was inaugurated.

=== 2017 port project proposal ===
In late November 2017, pro-Beijing businessman and Chinese People's Political Consultative Conference (CPPCC) member Gao Jingde, on behalf of a consortium led by Hong Kong-listed Sunbase International (Holdings) Ltd of which he is chairman, proposed building Scandinavia's largest port at Lysekil.

== Transport ==
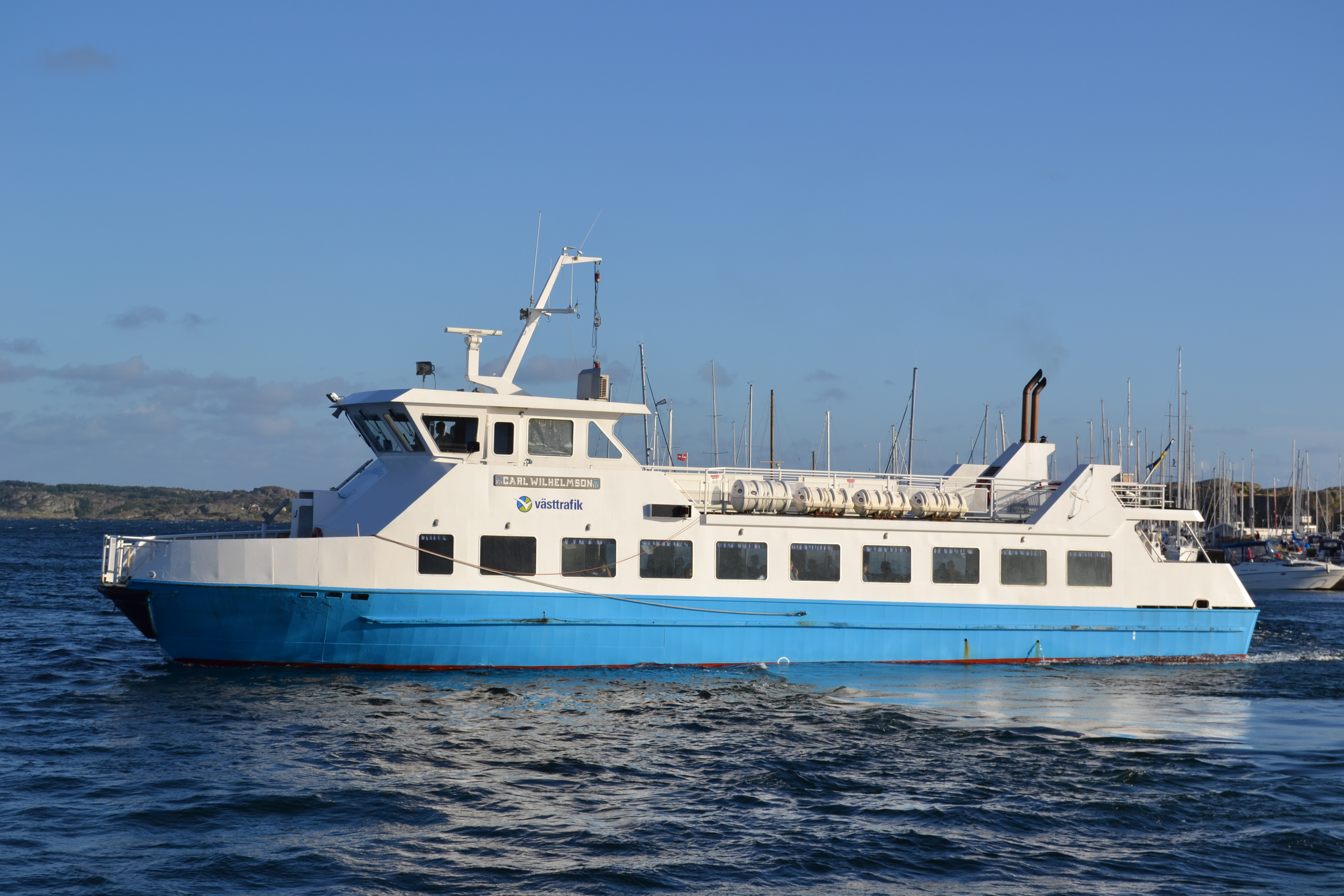
Passenger ferry M/S Carl Wilhelmsson

In 1910, Lysekil was connected with the rest of the Swedish railway network through the Lysekil Line, a branch railway of the Bohus Line. Passenger transport in the line, ceased in 1983, while some freight use remained. Maintenance in the line continued until 2016 with only a few trains running during summer. On 9 December 2018, all maintenance and traffic on the line will cease as the switch in Smedberg is disconnected.

The public transportation bus network in Lysekil is operated by Västtrafik. The network also includes a ferry, Elise (line 847), between Lysekil and Fiskebäckskil on the other side of Gullmarn fjord. Elise was preceded by M/S Carl Wilhelmsson, locally known as Calle Wille Another ferry service across the fjord from Lysekil is the car ferry operated by Trafikverket Färjerederiet.

== Sights and events ==
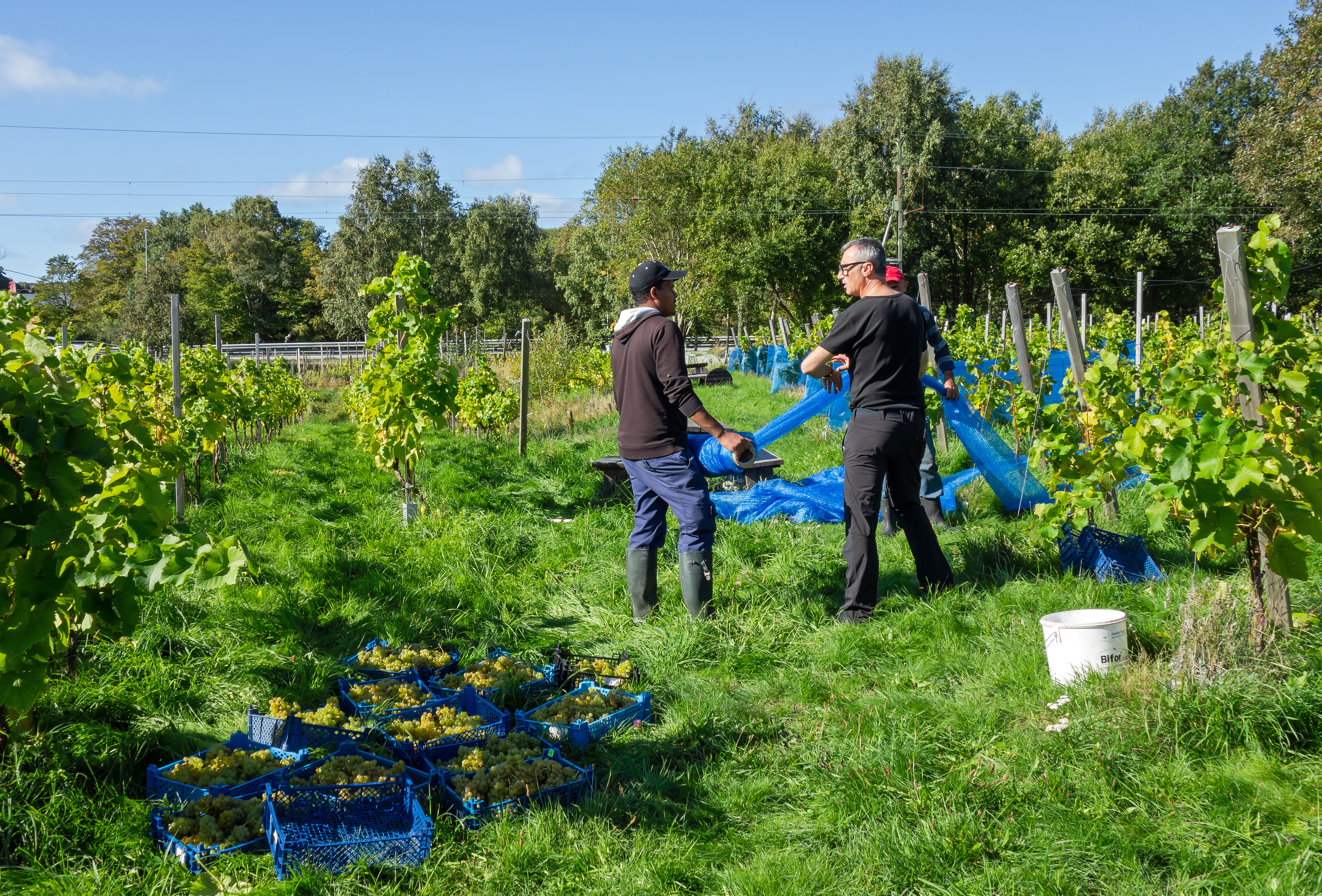
Harvest in Chateaux Luna vineyard

- Havets Hus is a public aquarium showcasing the animals living in the sea surrounding Lysekil. The aquarium cooperates with the Institute of Marine Research, part of Swedish University of Agricultural Sciences.
- Vikarvets Museum is a Working Life Museum with exhibits about life in the old days in Bohuslän.
- Chateaux Luna at Café Luna in Lysekil, is one of the few vineyards in Sweden producing its own wine.
- Lysekil Women's Match is an annual match racing sailing competition in Lysekil.
- Lysekil Cruising is an annual cruising event held on Midsummer's Eve. With around 1,500 vintage cars, the event is one of the biggest in Sweden, occupying the whole town during the Midsummer weekend.
- Lysekils Giant's cauldron at Testholmen
- Curmans Villa

== Sport ==
The football club, Slättens IK, is located in Lysekil.

== Notable people from Lysekil ==
- Nathalie Djurberg (born 1978), artist
- Mats Fransson (born 1962), handballer
- Bert Lundin (1921–2018), union leader
- Harry Macfie (1879–1956), writer
- William Matson (1849–1917), Swedish-American shipping executive.
- Fredrik Risp (born 1980), football player.
- Leif Wikstrom (1918–1991), sailor

== Gallery ==
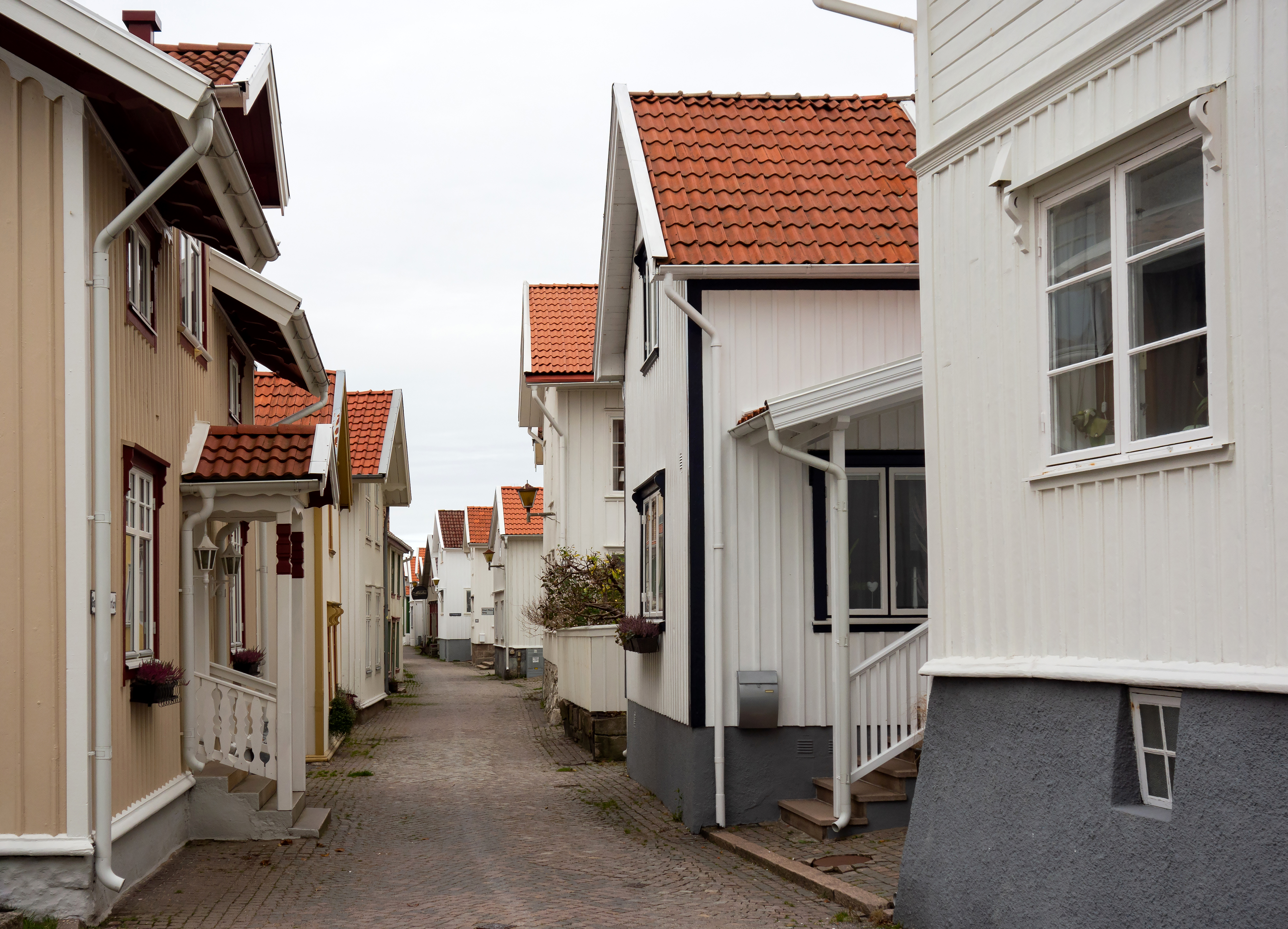
The restored old fishermen houses in Gamlestan (Old Town) at the North Harbor

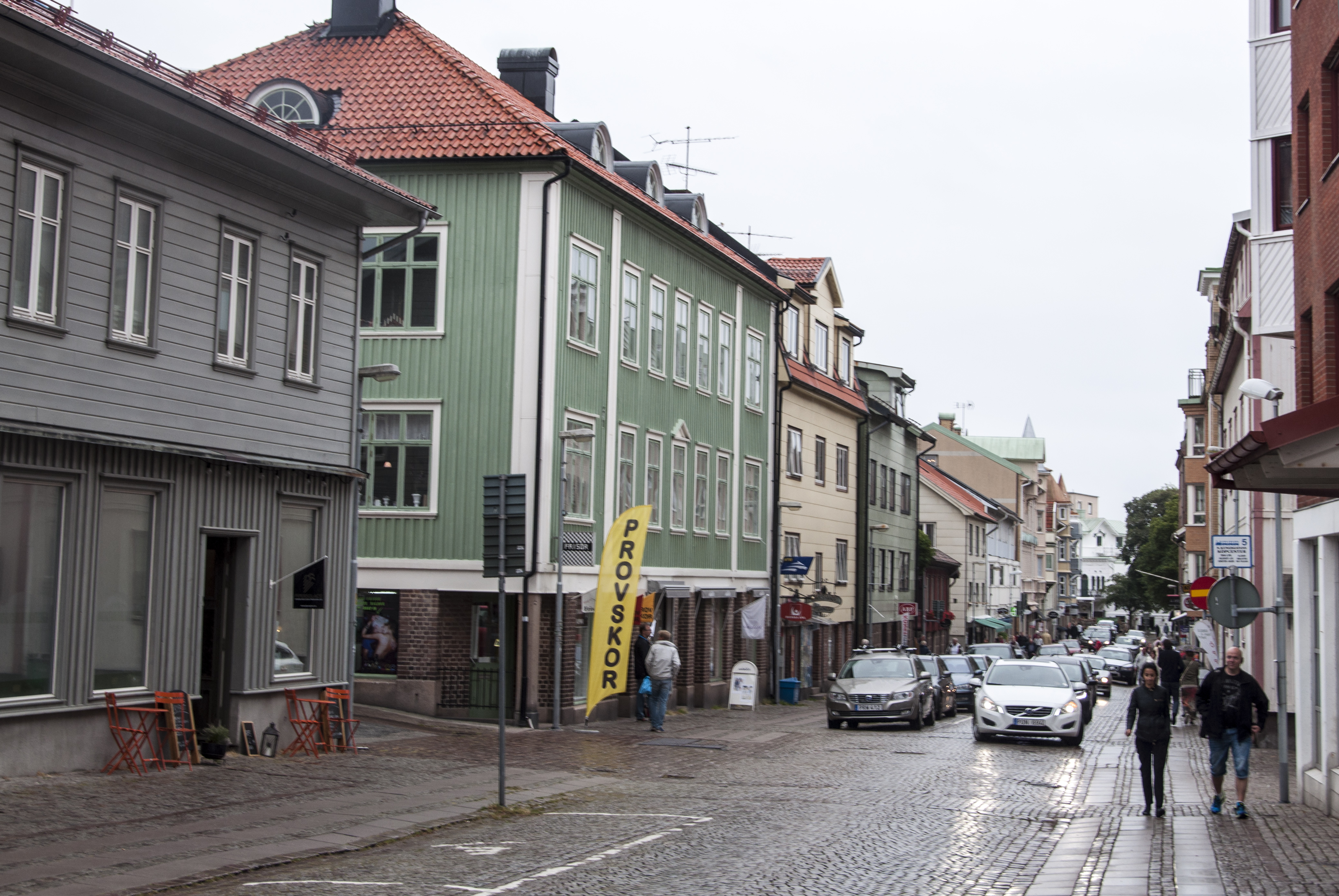
Lysekil main street

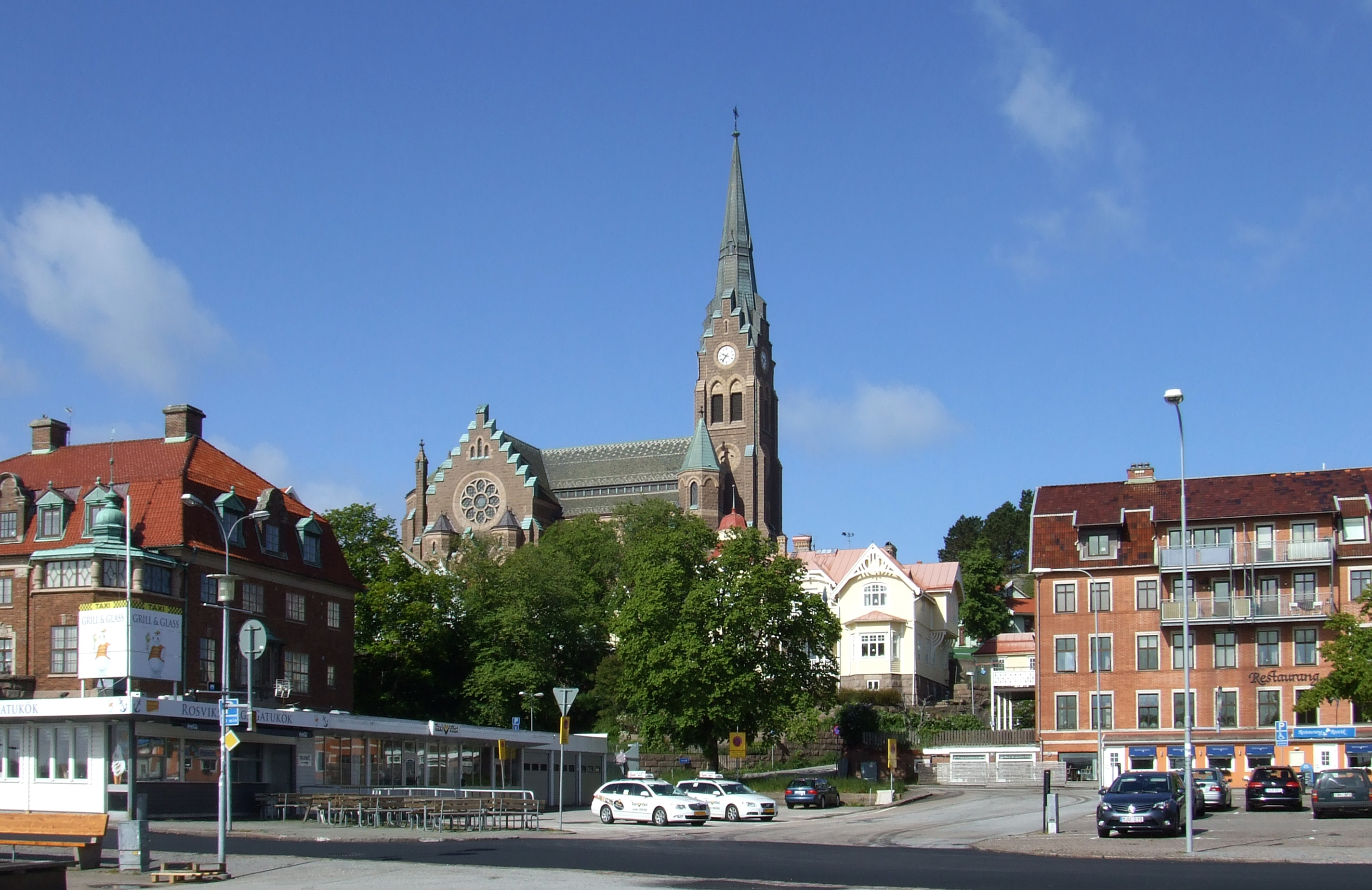
Lysekil Church as seen from the harbor

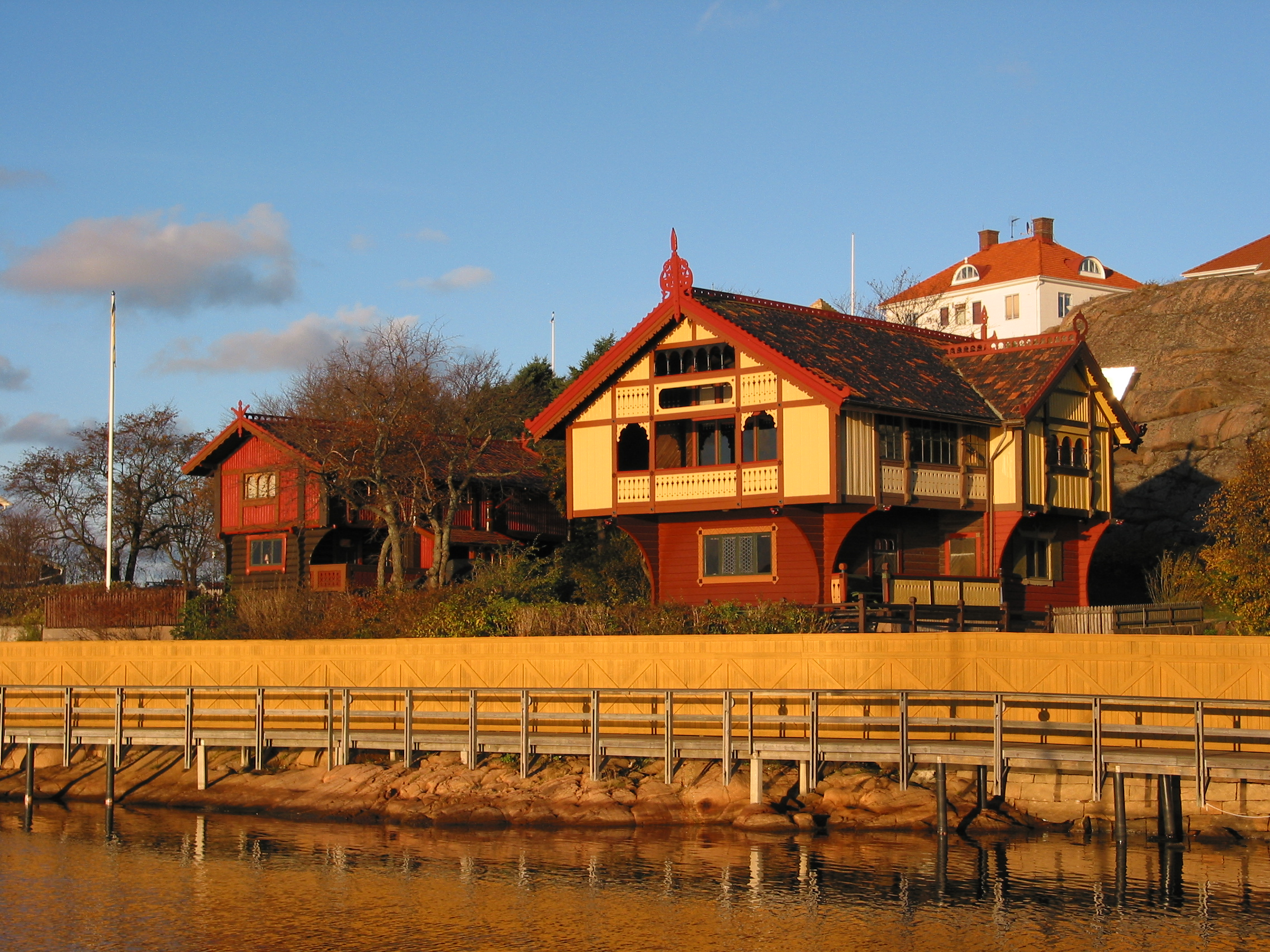
Curman's villas

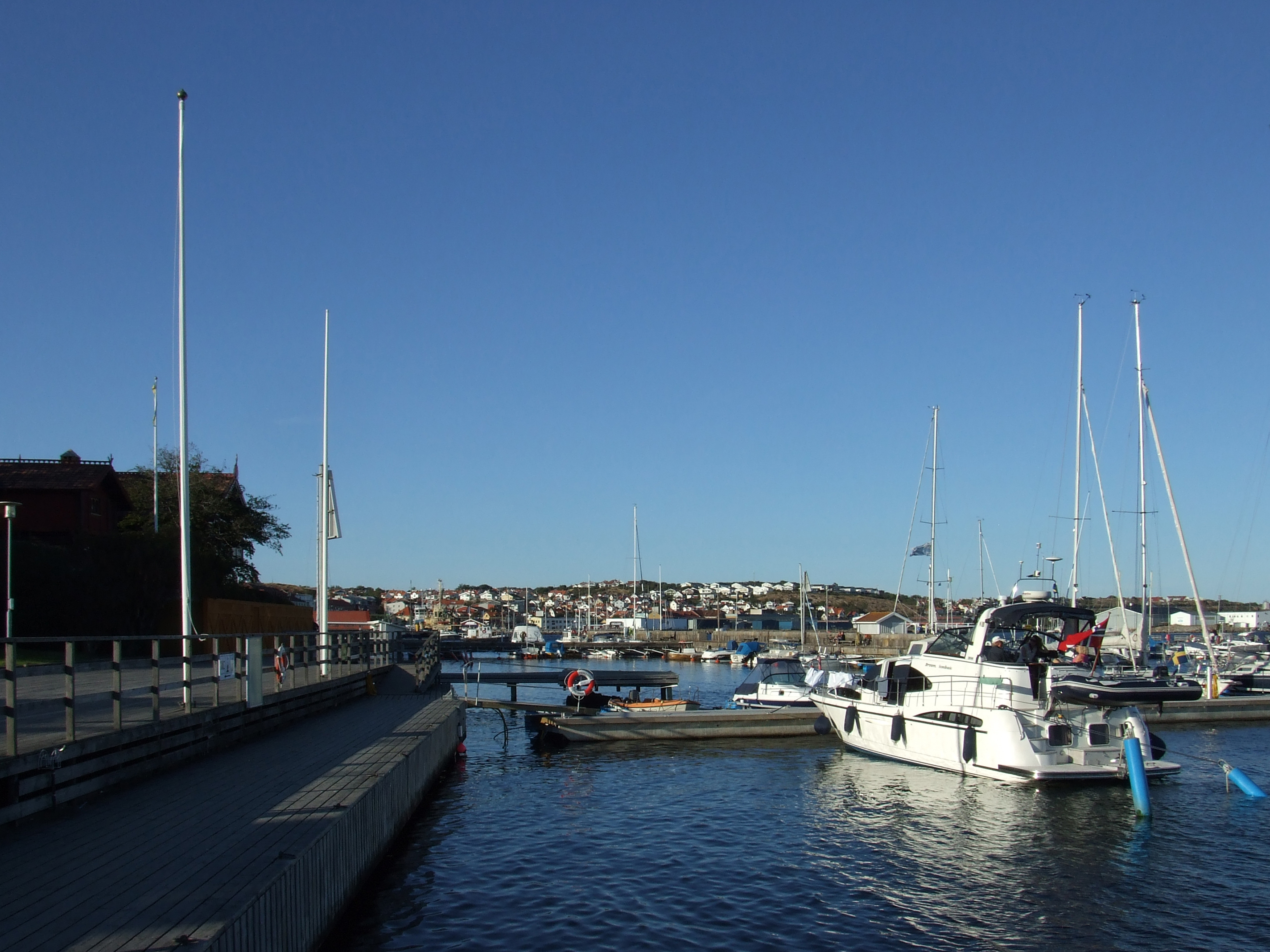
Boats in the South Harbor

== See also ==
- Lysekil Project
