= Oronsay Priory =

Priory in Argyll and Bute, Scotland

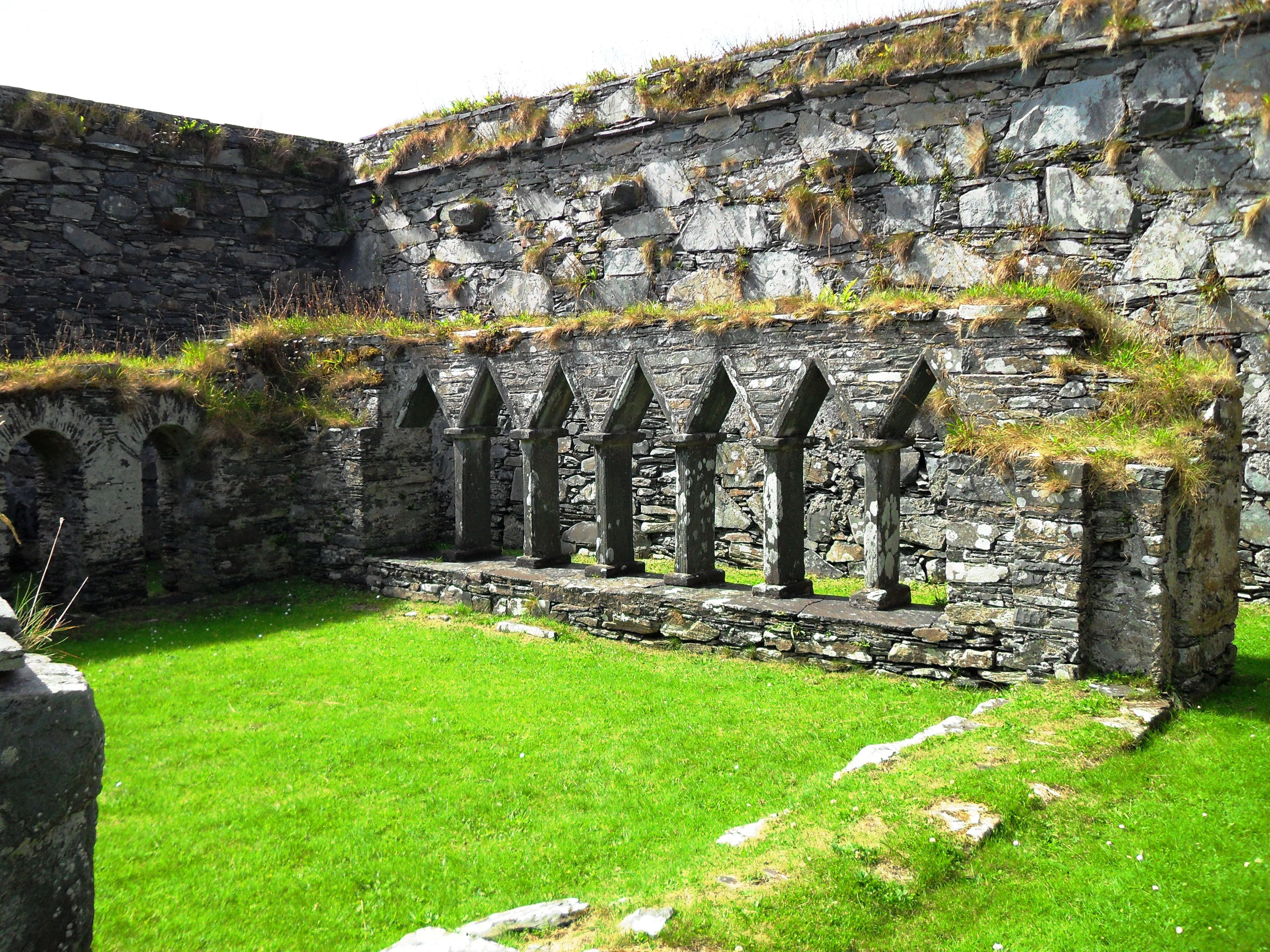
- Oronsay Priory cloisters
- Interactive map of Oronsay Priory

Monastery information
- Order: Canons Regular
- Established: 14th century
- Disestablished: 1560
- Controlled churches: Christian

Site
- Location: Oronsay, Inner Hebrides, Argyll
- Coordinates: 56°01′00″N 6°16′00″W

Oronsay Priory was a monastery of canons regular on the island of Oronsay, Inner Hebrides, Argyll, off the coast of Scotland. It was established in the 14th century under the patronage of John of Islay, Lord of the Isles. It was dedicated to St. Columba, and perhaps was a continuation or a re-activation of an older foundation. Very little is known about it because of the absence of records and its remoteness from the Scottish Lowlands, but on occasions some of the Priors of Oronsay come into the records.

== The Priory ==
The priory continued in operation until at least 1560, the year of the Scottish Reformation, with the last known prior, Robert Lamont, having been elected in 1555. The lands and property of the priory were given in commendam to Maol Choluim MacDubhthaich in 1561. They were later given to the Bishop of the Isles by King James VI of Scotland after his ascendancy to the throne in 1583. Restoration work and excavation and recording were carried out in 1883 by the architect William de B M Galloway and again in 1927 by the Ministry of Works and are visible today, together with the High Cross, as a scheduled monument.

Additional burial enclosures were added as late as the 19th century.

== High Cross ==
The High Cross stands about four metres east of the ruins of the monastery church and rises from a four-tiered foundation. From the inscription it can be seen that the cross recalls the death of the prior Colin, who presided over the Oronsay monastery and probably dates from the year 1510, Colin's dying year. On the westward side of the cross are scenes of the crucifixion of Jesus and on the east side are foliage motifs.

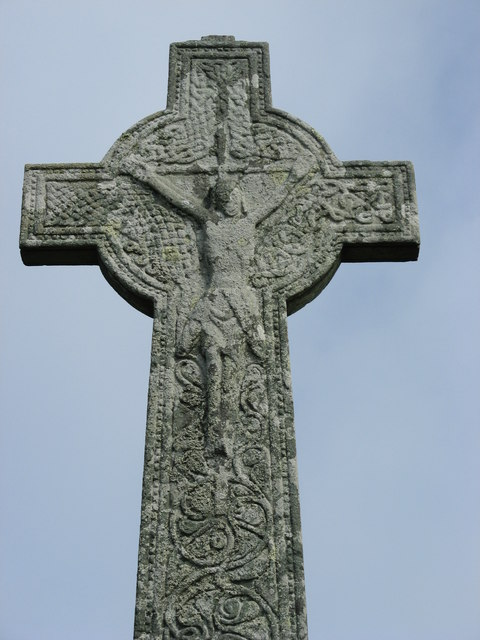
The High Cross

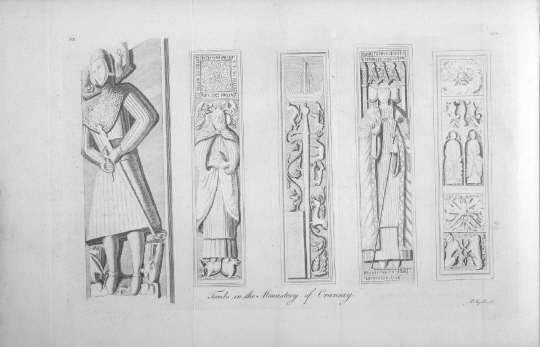
Tombstones in Oronsay Priory--one can see the figure of a canon, wearing the rochet proper to a canon regular, on the second image from the left

== See also ==
- John of Islay, Lord of the Isles
- Prior of Oronsay
- List of monastic houses in Scotland

== Bibliography ==
- Cowan, Ian B. & Easson, David E., Medieval Religious Houses: Scotland With an Appendix on the Houses in the Isle of Man, Second Edition, (London, 1976), p. 76
- Watt, D.E.R. & Shead, N.F. (eds.), The Heads of Religious Houses in Scotland from the 12th to the 16th Centuries, The Scottish Records Society, New Series, Volume 24, (Edinburgh, 2001), pp. 165–7
