= Clan Macfie =

Scottish clan

- Crest: A demi lion rampant Proper
- Motto: Pro rege (For the King)

Profile
- Region: Highlands
- District: Colonsay
- Plant badge: Scots fir, oak or crowberry
- Clan Macfie no longer has a chief, and is an armigerous clan
- Historic seat: Dùn Eibhinn
- Last Chief: Malcolm Macfie of Colonsay
- Died: 1623
- Commander: Ian McPhee of Halifax.
Septs of Clan Macfie
MacFee, MacAfee, McAfee, MacAffee, McAffee, MacFie, Macfie, McFie, Mcfie, MacPhee, Macphee, McPhee, McPhie, Mcphee, Macafee, Mcafee, Macaffee, Mcaffee, Mahaffey, Mahaffy, Mehaffey, Mehaffy, Mehaffie

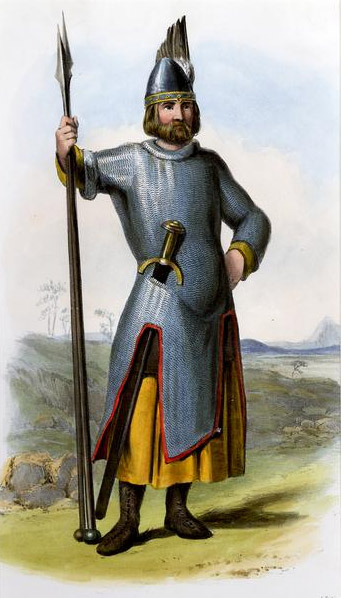
"Mac Phee". A Victorian era, romanticised depiction of a member of the clan by R. R. McIan, from The Clans of the Scottish Highlands, published in 1845.

The proposed descent of the seven clans of Siol Alpin.

Clan Macfie is a Highlands Scottish Clan.

Since 1981, the clan has been officially registered with the Court of the Lord Lyon, which is the heraldic authority of Scotland.

The clan is considered an armigerous clan because even though the clan is recognised by the Court of the Lord Lyon, it is currently without a chief recognised by the Lord Lyon King of Arms, the judge of the Court of the Lord Lyon.

The official clan name Macfie is derived from the Common Gaelic Mac Dhuibhshíthe (modern Scottish Gaelic Scottish Gaelic: MacDhubhShìth. This Gaelic patronymic name has been Anglicised into various forms, many of which are considered associated names of the clan. The clan has a long history with the islands of Colonsay and Oronsay in the Scottish Inner Hebrides, and today many monuments to various lairds and churchmen of the clan are found on these islands.

The 19th century historian W. F. Skene named the clan as one of the seven clans of Siol Alpin—who according to Skene could all trace their ancestry back to Alpin, father of Cináed mac Ailpín.

Little is known of the early history of the clan. However, is certain that the clan served under the Lords of the Isles—descendants of Somerled, who ruled the Hebrides from the 14th century to the late 16th century. Following the forfeiture of the Lordship of the Isles in the late 15th century, the clan still attached itself to powerful Macdonalds. In the early 17th century the last chief of the clan was executed as Colonsay was lost to the control of a Macdonald. Without a chief of their own to control their home lands the clan was considered a leaderless "broken clan". From this point on the Macfies followed the Macdonalds of Islay, though a branch of the clan was dispersed to lands controlled by Clan Cameron. In the early 19th century Ewen Macphee became a notorious outlaw, "revered and feared by locals and despised by the authorities". Today the modern Clan Macfie is alive with nine associated clan societies located around the world.

== History ==
The 19th-century historian W. F. Skene, stated that members of Clan Macfie were the ancient inhabitants of Colonsay. He also wrote that the clan was one of the seven clans of Siol Alpin, and that "their genealogy, which is preserved in the manuscript of 1450, evinces their connexion by descent with the Macgregors and Mackinnons". The seven clans of Siol Alpin could, according to Skene, trace their descent from Alpin, father of the traditional first King of Scots: Cináed mac Ailpín. However, even while stating all this, he wrote that there was nothing known about the early history of Clan Macfie. Over a century after Skene, W. D. H. Sellar wrote that according to later Gaelic tradition, Dubside, ancestor of Clan Macfie, fostered Aonghas Mór, Lord of Islay (Sellar describes Aonghas Mór as the first MacDonald).

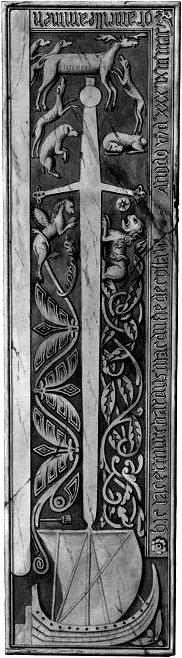
Tomb of Murchardus Macdufie, who died in 1539. On a visit to Colonsay in the 18th century, Sir Joseph Banks was informed that, "[Macdufie] was a factor or manager for Macdonald King of the Isles upon these islands of Oransay and Colonsay & that for his mismanagement & tyranny he was executed by order of that prince". (Note: This image was drawn by John Cleveley, junior, from a sketch taken on 8 August 1772. On the back of the drawing is the quotation given above, presumably made by Sir Joseph Banks who travelled to the Western Isles around 1772.)

Martin, in his A Description of the Western Isles of Scotland of 1703, wrote that on the south side of the church of St. Columba on Oronsay, were the tombstones of MacDuffie (or Macfie, a former chief of the clan) and the cadets of his family. The principal stone bore the engraving of a birlinn, two handed claymore and the inscription "Hic jacit Malcolumbus MacDuffie de Collonsay" ("Here lies Malcolumbus MacDuffie of Colonsay"). The burial place of the Macfies was a small chapel, on the south side of the church on Oronsay. Another stone is for Sir Donald MacDuffie, who was abbot of Oronsay when Donald Munro, High Dean of the Isles, toured the Western Isles in 1549.

According to a manuscript, written in the 17th century, pertaining to the coronation of the Lords of the Isles, and the Council of the Isles, "MacDuffie, or MacPhie of Colonsay, kept the records of the Isles". In 1463 Macfie of Colonsay was a member of the Council of the Isles, listed as Donald Macduffie, a witness to a charter by John of Islay, Earl of Ross, the last Lord of the Isles, dated 12 April at the Earl's castle of Dingwall. After the fall of the Lordship of the Isles the Macfies followed the MacDonalds of Islay. In 1531, the chief of the clan, "Morphe Makphe de Colwisnay", and many other west highland chiefs were cited for treason and summoned to Parliament as supporters of the rebellious Alexander MacDonald of Dunivaig and the Glens. This Macfie chief died in 1539 and his impressive tombstone can still be seen (pictured left).

Donald Munro, High Dean of the Isles, in his A Description of the Western Isles of Scotland Called Hybrides, in 1549, described the island of Jura as partly controlled by Maclean of Duart, Maclaine of Lochbuie, and Macfie of Colonsay. (Note: "Clandonald of Kyntyre, pairt be Mac Gullayne of Douard, pairt be M’Gellayne of Kinlochbuy, pairt be M’Duffithie of Colvansay".) In describing the island of Colonsay, Monro wrote that it had once been held by Macdonald of Kintyre, but was then currently ruled by a "gentle capitane, callit M’Duffyhe" — gentle meaning 'well-born', and captain being the old styling of 'chief'. (Note: "this ile is bruikit be ane gentle capitane, callit M’Duffyhe, and pertened of auld to Clandonald of Kyntyre".)

By 1587, atrocities committed between warring west highland clans had escalated to such an extent that Parliament devised what is known as the General Band in an effort to quell hostilities. The band was signed by landowners throughout the Scottish Highlands, borders and the islands, requiring them to be responsible for the men who lived within their lands. The signing chiefs were required to come up with sureties equal to their wealth and lands for the peaceful conduct of their followers. In it the laird of Colonsay, "M'Fee of Collowsay" (Murdoch Macfie of Colonsay), is listed as one of the landlords in the Scottish highlands and islands where broken men (or lawless men) dwelt. (Note: "landislordis and baillies of lands in the hieland and iles, quhair brokin men hes duelt and presentlie duellis".) Despite the Governments actions to secure the peace, about this time Lachlan Mor MacLean of Duart ravaged the MacDonald islands of Islay and Gigha, slaughtering 500–600 men. Maclean of Duart then besieged Angus MacDonald of Dunivaig and the Glens at his Castle Dunivaig. The siege was only lifted when Macdonald of Dunivaig and the Glens agreed with Maclean of Duart to surrender half of his lands on Islay. However, despite his agreement with the Macleans, Macdonald of Dunivaig and the Glens then invaded the Maclean islands of Mull, Tiree, Coll and Luing. Angus Macdonald of Dunivaig and the Glens was aided in the action by Donald Gorm Mor Macdonald of Sleat and many west highland clans such as the Macdonalds of Clanranald, MacIains of Ardnamurchan, Macleods of Lewis, MacNeills of Gigha, MacAlisters of Loup and also the Macfies of Colonsay. Supporting Maclean of Duart were the Macleods of Harris and Dunvegan, MacNeils of Barra, Mackinnons of Strathrodle and the Macquarries of Ulva.

In 1609, "Donald Mcfie in Collonsaye" was present at the assembly of island chiefs and gentlemen, who met with the Bishop of the Isles at Iona, when the nine Statutes of Icolmkill were enacted, which were to bring the Western Isles under the control of the Scottish Parliament.

=== Fall of the Clan ===
In 1615 Malcolm Macfie of Colonsay supported Sir James Macdonald of Islay, Chief of "Clan Donald South", after Macdonald had escaped from Edinburgh Castle. Macfie was one of the principal leaders in Macdonald's rebellion against the Government, who had promised Islay to the Campbells. The combined forces of Macfie and Donald Gigach MacIan, who was the leading man on the nearby isle of Jura, contributed a total of 64 men to the Macdonald rebellion. When Sir James Macdonald's force of 400 men landed in at Kinloch (Campbelton) in Kintyre, they were made up in part by the "special men" from Islay, Macfie of Colonsay, Donald Gigach of Jura, Allaster MacRanald of Keppoch, and North Islesmen.

The Earl of Argyll later secured the submission of Colla Ciotach MacDonald, who was another chief of Clan Donald South. Colla Ciotach then captured Malcolm Macfie of Colonsay, among eighteen others, and handed them over to the Earl of Argyll. Malcolm Macfie, along with another rebel leader, received assurance for their lives by serving on the Government's side against the rebels while in the company of the Earl of Argyll. The Earl, in late 1615, presented the captured to the Privy Council.

For several years both Colla Ciotach and the Macfie chief lived on Colonsay, with Colla Ciotach residing at Kiloran and Macfie at Dùn Eibhinn. During this time the two feuded. Judging by the many hiding places which bear his name, such as leab' fhalaich Mhic a Phì ("MacPhee's Hiding Place"), Macfie was chased from one to another for quite sometime. Finally, in 1623, Malcolm Macfie was chased from Colonsay and pursued to Eilean nan Ròn (south-west of Oronsay). There, on the south-western corner of Eilean nan Ròn, called an t Eilean Iarach, he was spotted and taken by the MacDonalds. Popular lore has it that the Macfie chief was finally discovered when his hiding place amongst the seaweed was given away by a gull. As it hovered over Macfie's position, Colla Ciotach's men were alerted by its cry and spotted the clan chief on a ledge of rock at the edge of the sea. After being apprehended, the chief was then tied to a stone and summarily shot. Colla Ciotach, and several of his followers, appear in the Council Records in 1623 as being accused of killing the Macfie chief. Because of the death of their chief the Macfies finally lost control of Colonsay. The island then passed to the Macdonalds, as Colla Ciotach took the island for himself, and held it peacefully for many years.

The island was later to be absorbed into the earldom of Argyll, until it was sold in 1701 to McNeill or Crear. Without its own chief the clan became a "broken clan" and for the most part followed the Macdonalds of Islay, with Macfies/Macphees making up only a small proportion of the total population of Colonsay. A branch of the clan, after the collapse of the clan, settled in Lochaber and followed Cameron of Lochiel, chief of Clan Cameron. A Macfie (a Macphee of Clan Cameron) was one of the two pipers at Glenfinnan, when on 19 August 1745 Charles Edward Stuart raised his standard and claimed both the Scottish and English throne in the name of his father James Francis Edward Stuart. The following year Macfies were among the Camerons, who were on the right flank at the Jacobite Army at the Battle of Culloden.

==== Macphee the Outlaw ====
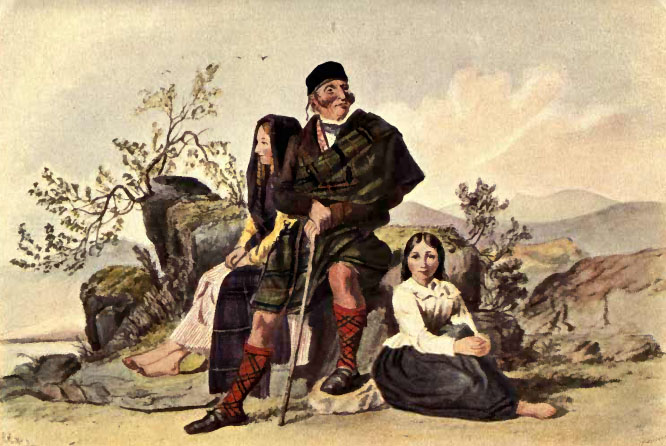
"Ewen Mac Phee the Outlaw". An illustration by R. R. McIan, originally appearing in his work: Gaelic gatherings, or the Highlanders at Home on heather, river and loch, published in 1848.

A well-known character in Inverness-shire, in the 19th century, was a Ewan Macphee who lived as an outlaw. Described as Scotland's last outlaw, he recognised no landowner, stole sheep, and raised a family upon a small island. Ewan Macphee was a young man when he was enlisted by his landlord into a Highland Regiment of the British Army. Macphee was said to have been an able soldier but he soon deserted the Army and fled to his native Glengarry, where he hid living in Feddan with his sister. (Note: Feddan from the Scottish Gaelic feadan – used in placenames and meaning "reed, canal", "opening", "streamlet".) For the Fedden in Glengarry, www.clan-cameron.org states "'Crevice Through Which the Winds Blows'. Site of a croft which sat right on a disputed Cameron-Glengarry boundary line, just below Meall an Tagraidh. The elderly woman who lived here managed to divert a stream each time either the Cameron or Glengarry men came to collect the rent. She managed to avoid paying rent for years, claiming her home was on the other side of the boundary stream". His Regiment then sent a troop of soldiers to arrest him for desertion, though just as Macphee was about to be taken handcuffed aboard a steamer at Corpach, he managed to escape and fled his captors. Ewan Macphee lived for two years around the shores of Loch Arkaig before building a bothy on a small island in Loch Quoich, which has since born his name: Eilen Mhic Phee (translation from Scottish Gaelic: "MacPhee's island"). Macphee then took for his wife a fourteen-year-old girl, who lived across the hill in Glen Dulochan. As time passed Macphee was feared and looked upon by the poor inhabitants of the glen as a seer. Macphee believed himself to have supernatural powers, he weaved charms and cattle were brought to him to be cured. As the years past neighbouring shepherds finally decided to put an end to Macphee's sheep stealing, and the sheriff sent two officers to confront Macphee. As the officers rowed to his island they were fired upon by Macphee's wife and the officers fled. A week later an armed party was then sent and Ewan Macphee was finally arrested and taken to prison, where he eventually died.

=== The modern Clan ===
In 1864, the first Macfies to have coats of arms registered in the Public Register of All Arms and Bearings in Scotland were Robert Macfie of Langhouse and Airds and Robert Andrew Macfie of Dreghorn—two highly successful businessmen in the sugar industry. (Note: The company was later taken over by Tate & Lyle.) The heraldic crest within the clan's crest badge is actually derived from the heraldic crest on the coat of arms of Robert Andrew Macfie of Dreghorn. In 1968, Earle Douglas MacPhee of Vancouver, British Columbia, Canada started a movement to have the Clan Macfie officially registered with the Lord Lyon King of Arms. On 10 May 1977, the Macfie Standing Stone on Balaruminmore on Colonsay was dedicated as a memorial to the last chief of the clan, who was executed against it in 1623. In May 1981, Clan Macfie was formally recognised by the Lord Lyon King of Arms and later in November of that year, Earle MacPhee was appointed as Commander of Clan Macfie by the Lord Lyon King of Arms. Following Earle MacPhee's death in 1982, Alexander (Sandy) Carpendale McPhie of Australia was appointed by the Lord Lyon King of Arms as Commander of Clan Macfie on 7 September 1989. In March 2008, the Lord Lyon gave permission for Clan Macfie to convene an ad hoc derbhfine to choose a successor to McPhie, who had by then decided to step down. Iain Morris McFie was chosen to petition the Lord Lyon, and on doing so was later appointed as Commander of Clan Macfie.

Arms of the Macfie Clan Commander Iain Morris McFie of Coulintyre.

Arms of the previous Macfie Clan Commander A. C. (Sandy) McPhie of Townsville.

Arms of Macfie of Dreghorn, Edinburgh.

Arms of Macfie of Langhouse, Renfrewshire, and of Airds, Argyll.

Today there are nine clan societies associated with Clan Macfie. The societies are located around the world in Australia, Canada, New Zealand, Scotland, Sweden, and the United States of America.

== Clan profile ==
The Oronsay Cross located on Oronsay was carved in around 1500 for Malcolm MacDuffie, lord of Colonsay.

=== Origin of the name ===
The origin of name Macfie (and its variations) is from the Gaelic Mac Dhuibhshíthe, which means "son of Duibhshíth". This Gaelic personal name is composed of two elements: dubh ("black") + síth ("peace"). An early bearer of this personal name is recorded in the Annals of Ulster. This Dub Sidhe (Dubshidhe) was listed being the lector of the monastic community at Iona in the year 1164. (Note: The entry within the Annals of Ulster reads in English "Select members of the Community of Ia, namely, the arch-priest, Augustin and the lector (that is, Dubsidhe) and the Eremite, Mac Gilla-duib and the Head of the Celi-De, namely, Mac Forcellaigh and select members of the Community of Ia besides came on behalf of the successor of Colum-cille, namely, Flaithbertach Ua Brolchain's acceptance of the abbacy of Ia, by advice of Somharlidh and of the Men of Airthir-Gaedhel and of Insi-Gall; but the successor of Patrick and the king of Ireland, that is, Ua Lochlainn and the nobles of Cenel-Eogain prevented him".) The name Macfie (and its variations) is rendered as Mac a' Phì in modern Scottish Gaelic.

According to a passage in the Carmina Gadelica, which was a collection of Gaelic folkloric poems from 1855 to 1910, there was a family on North Uist which was known as Dubh-sith (translation from Gaelic: "black fairy"), "from a tradition that the family have been familiar with the fairies in their fairy flights and secret migrations". This family were the North Uist MacCuishes, who also for a time, commonly bore Dubhsith as a given name. There were never many MacCuishes on the Uists, and after a time Dubhsith ceased to be used as a given name there, though it carried on in Cape Breton, Nova Scotia, Canada, taking the forms of Dushie, Duffus and even David. These MacCuishes (of North Uist and Skye) are considered septs of Clan Donald. (Note: "Those from North Uist or Skye. MacCuishes not of Clan Donald may be of Clan MacDuffie. Clan Donald MacCuishes derive from the Gaelic: MacDubhsidh – 'son of the black one of peace'. Originally MacDuffies who came to North Uist & Skye – Clan Donald North".)

==== Genealogy according to MS 1467 ====
In the early 19th century, Skene found and transcribed a 15th-century Gaelic manuscript which gave the genealogies of many Highland clans. He first published his transcriptions and translations of it in the early 19th century Collectanea de Rebus Albanicis, and later with revisions in the late 19th century—in his chief work Celtic Scotland. Today the manuscript, which Skene named MS 1450 and later MS 1467, is stored in the National Library of Scotland. The manuscript was written by Dubhghall Albanach mac mhic Cathail, in 1467 at Ballybothy, County Tipperary. The following is Skene's versions of the genealogy attributed to the chiefs of Clan Macfie in the manuscript; first as in Collectanea de Rebus Albanicis secondly as in Celtic Scotland.

Donald, Niell, and Malcolm the three sons of Gillespic son of ...... son of Gilchrist son of Malcolm son of Dugald mor son of Duffie son of Murdoch son of Finlay the rash, son of Murdoch son of Ferchar son of Cormac son of Oirbertaigh son of Ferchar fada son of Feredach.

— Collectanea de rebus albanicis

Donald and Niall and Malcolm the three sons of, Gillespic son of, Gillchrist son of, Malcolm son of, Dougall mor son of, Dubshithe son of, Murdoch son of, Finlaech cas son of, Murdoch son of, Ferchard son of, Cormac son of, Airbertach son of, Feradach.

— Celtic Scotland

According to Skene in Collectanea de Rebus Albanicis, the Donald first mentioned may be the Donald MacDuffie who is recorded as witnessing a charter by John, Earl of Ross and Lord of the Isles in 1463. In Celtic Scotland, Skene thought it was possible the mentioned Duffie/Dubshithe was identical to the lector of Iona recorded in 1164 within the Irish annals.

=== Clan symbols (crest badge and clan badges) ===
Scottish crest badges are used by clan members to show their allegiance to their clan and chief. Much like clan tartans, crest badges owe their popularity to Victorian romanticism. Crest badges are heraldic badges which usually contain the heraldic crest of the clan chief, encircled with a buckle containing the chief's heraldic motto. However, in the case of Clan Macfie, which does not have a chief, the crest badge is derived from the coat of arms of Macfie of Dreghorn, who was one of the first Macfies to register a coat of arms in the Public Register of All Arms and Bearings in Scotland. The crest badge of Clan Macfie contains as a crest: a demi lion rampant, proper. The motto which encircles the crest is: pro rege, which translated from Latin means "for the king".

Although today crest badges are more commonly used by clan members, the original badges worn by clansmen were plant badges or clan badges. Clan badges consisted of plants which were worn on a bonnet or attached to a pole or spear. There have been several clan badges attributed to Clan Macfie, and the clans shares the use of them with several associated clans. Clan badges attributed to Clan Macfie include: scots pine (Scottish Gaelic: giuthas), attributed to all seven of the clans of Siol Alpin; oak (Scottish Gaelic: darag), also attributed to Clan Cameron; crowberry (Scottish Gaelic: dearca fithich), also attributed to Clan Maclean and Clan Cameron.

=== Tartan ===
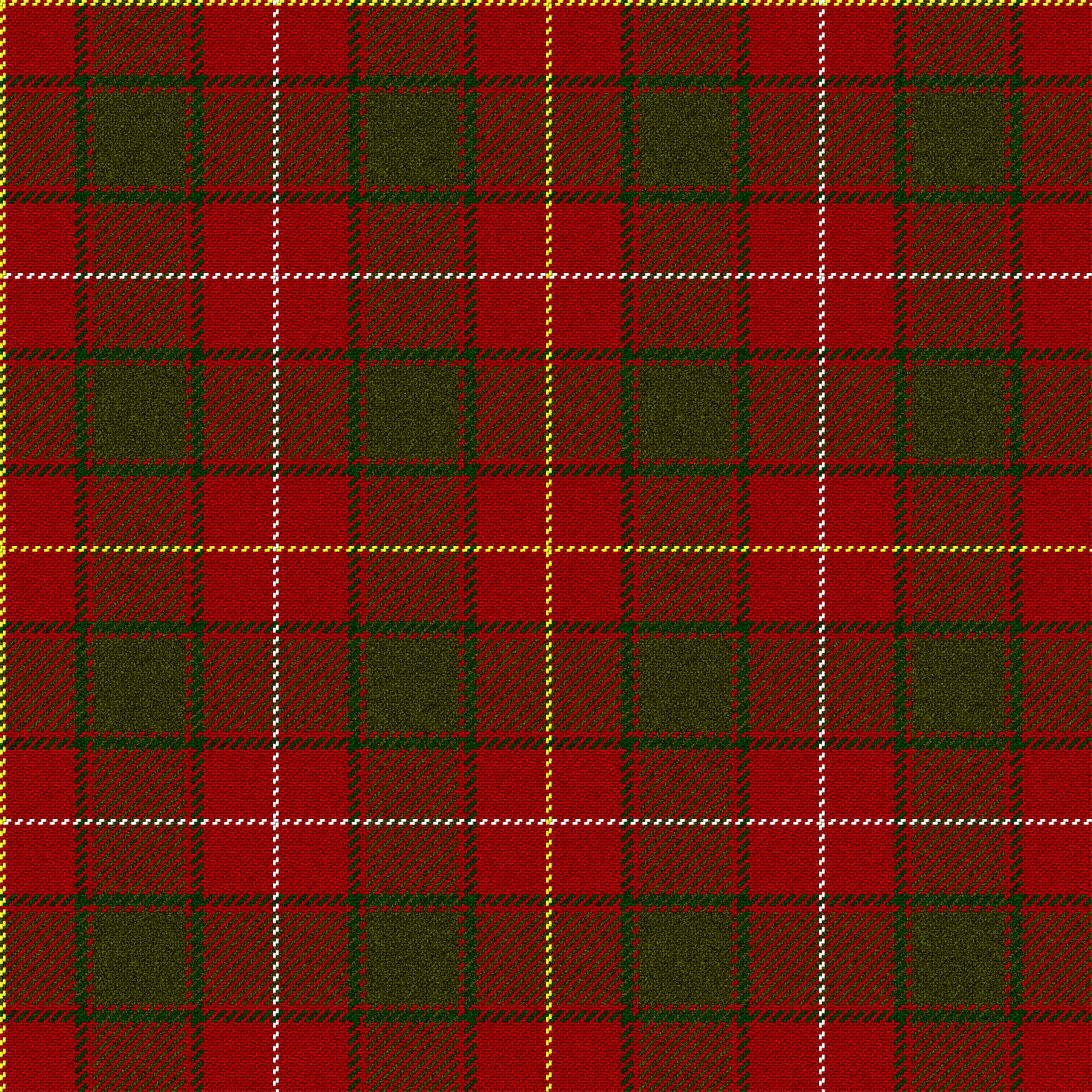
The official Clan Macfie tartan, first recorded in 1906, was registered with the Lord Lyon in 1991. It is very similar to the Clan MacIver tartan, yet the colours are said to allude to those of the Clan Cameron tartan.

The clan's official "Clan Macfie Tartan" was registered in the Books of the Court of the Lord Lyon King of Arms on 29 August 1991. It is possible the tartan may date back to about the time of the first Macfie coats of arms were registered in the mid 19th century. However, it was first recorded in 1906, in Johnston's The Tartans of the Clans and Septs of Scotland. The tartan is very similar to the MacIver tartan – swapping the colour green for the MacIver black. However, it has been said that the colours (red, green and yellow) and the general appearance of the Macfie tartan are similar to the Cameron tartan, and that it may allude to the dependence on Clan Cameron of several Macfies after the collapse of their clan. The Clan Cameron Association considers the surnames MacPhee, MacFie and MacVee as a sept (members, or followers) of Clan Cameron.

== Associated Clans and names ==
Today there are many variations of the clan name Macfie, meaning "son of Duibhshíth". People who bear such surnames are considered members of the clan. Clan Macfie also has historical links with other clans, such as Clan Cameron. As already stated, several members of Clan Macfie emigrated to lands controlled by Clan Cameron in the 17th century, and that Clan Cameron considers certain variations of Macfie as septs of theirs. There may be also a link between Clan Macfie and the MacNichols of Glenorchy. These MacNichols are considered a sept of Clan Campbell. The origin of the MacNichols of Glenorchy and Glenshira is unknown. Niall Campbell, 10th Duke of Argyll maintained they were originally MacNaughtons of Dunderave. However, local tradition had it that they were originally MacPhees, descended from Nicol MacPhee who left the Cameron controlled Lochaber region in the 16th century. According to Somerled MacMillan, there were recently (1971) many MacNichols in Lochaber who were supposed to descend from the members of Clan Macfie. Though they were to have held lands in the Lochaber area since before 1493.

== See also ==
- Colonsay
- Oronsay, Inner Hebrides
- Macfie
- McPhee
