= Mehaffy =

Mehaffy is a surname. Notable people with the surname include:

- Bert Mehaffy (1895–1970), Irish footballer
- Michael Mehaffy (born 1955), American urbanist and architectural theorist
- Pat Mehaffy (1904–1981), judge of the United States Court of Appeals for the Eighth Circuit
- Tom M. Mehaffy (1859–1944), justice of the Arkansas Supreme Court

== See also ==
- Clan Macfie, Scottish clan of which Mehaffy is a sept
- Tom Mehaffie (born 1971), American politician
- Mehaffey, a surname
