= Mahaffy =

Mahaffy is a surname of Scottish origin, and is an Anglicisation of the Gaelic name Mac Dhuibhshithe. It is a sept of Clan Macfie in Scotland, but the clan originated in Ireland. There the name is found largely in County Donegal, Ulster.

People with the surname Mahaffy include:

- Arthur Arnold Mahaffy (1861–1947), Canadian politician
- Arthur William Mahaffy (1869–1919), British colonial administrator
- Daniel Mahaffy (born 2005), English footballer
- George Mahaffy (1924–1980), American racing driver
- James Mahaffy (1905–1986), Canadian politician
- John Mahaffy (ice hockey) (1918–2015), Canadian hockey player
- John Pentland Mahaffy (1839–1919), Irish academic
- Leslie Mahaffy (1976–1991), Canadian murder victim

== See also ==
- Mahaffey, a variant of the surname
