= Mehaffey House =

Historic house in Arkansas, United States

- U.S. National Register of Historic Places
- U.S. Historic district – Contributing property
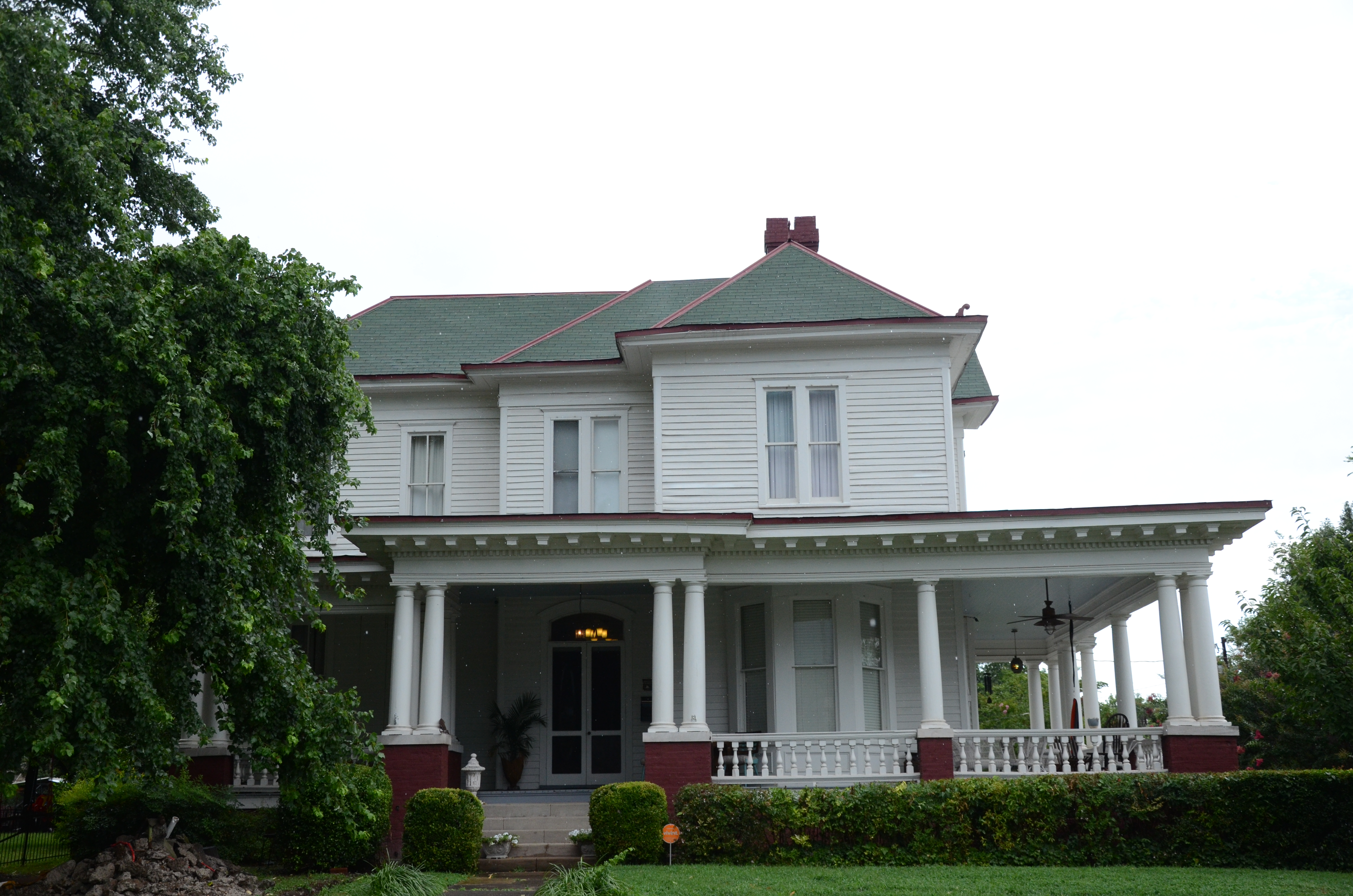

- Location within Arkansas Location within the United States
- Location: 2101 Louisiana, Little Rock, Arkansas
- Coordinates: 34°43′42″N 92°16′30″W
- Area: less than one acre
- Built: 1905
- Architect: Charles L. Thompson
- Architectural style: Colonial Revival, Transitional Colonial Rev
- Part of: Governor's Mansion Historic District (1988 enlargement) (ID88000631)
- MPS: Thompson, Charles L., Design Collection TR
- NRHP reference No.: 82000909

Significant dates
- Added to NRHP: December 22, 1982
- Designated CP: May 19, 1988

The Mehaffey House is a historic house at 2102 South Louisiana Street in Little Rock, Arkansas. It is a two-story wood-frame structure, with a hip roof and weatherboard siding. It has irregular massing characteristic of the late Victorian period, but has a classical Colonial Revival porch, with Tuscan columns supporting a dentillated and modillioned roof. The main entrance features a revival arched transom. The house was built about 1905 to a design by noted Arkansas architect Charles L. Thompson.

The house was listed on the National Register of Historic Places in 1982.

== See also ==
- National Register of Historic Places listings in Little Rock, Arkansas
