= Harry Macfie =

Harry Macfie (February 11, 1879 in Lysekil - died October 27, 1956) was a Swedish adventurer, writer and businessman. His grandfather came from Scotland. Macfie learned how to build and use canoes as fur trappers in Canada around the turn of the century. When he came back to Bohuslän he began building and selling Canadian style canoes with a canvas covering, called "Macfiekanoter". His canoes were displayed at the Swedish Exhibition Centre in Gothenburg in 1932.

Macfie also wrote a number of adventure novels with fur hunters as subjects, based on his own experiences in Canada. His books include Wasawasa (1935; together with Hans G. Westerlund), The Northern Lights Men (1938) and Goodbye, Falcon Lake (1943).
