= Robert Macfie Thorburn =

Swedish merchant and politician

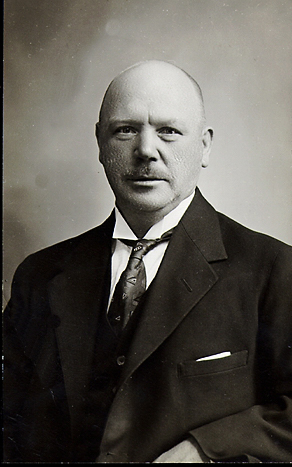

Robert Macfie Thorburn FRSE (27 April 1828 – 22 August 1896) was a 19th-century Swedish-Scots businessman and Swedish politician.

== Life ==
He was born in Kasen near Gothenburg, Sweden, one of ten children of William Thorburn (1780–1851) and his wife Janet Mafie (1790–1863), both from Scotland. Janet was the sister of Robert Andrew Macfie, after whom Robert was named. The family had moved from Scotland to Sweden in 1823 to help resolve financial difficulties in the firm of "Brodie & Thorburn" (set up by his younger brother James Thorburn and fellow Scot, William Brodie). He was probably sent to Edinburgh for schooling, and certainly had a circle of Edinburgh friends.

In 1851, when his father died, he and his brother, William Franklin Thorburn, took over the family import and shipping company, "William Thorburn and Sons" who seemed to deal in tea. He also had interests in the company "Macfie Lindsay & Co" who dealt in sugar.

In 1852, with his cousin William Andrew Macfie (1807–1899), he established the world's first curling club outside Scotland, the Bohuslanska Curling Club. His cousin had come to Uddevalla in Sweden in 1845, to help with the family companies. The company expanded into exporting of Swedish oats to London (as horse feed) and by the 1870s represented one quarter of all exports from Sweden.

In 1878, he was elected a Fellow of the Royal Society of Edinburgh. His proposers were Robert Andrew Macfie, Charles Wyville Thomson, John Hutton Balfour and Robert Boog Watson.

He died of a cerebral haemorrhage on 22 August 1896 at his mansion at Uddevalla.

== Family ==
In 1854, he was married to Alma Mathilda Jacobi (1833–1882) in Sweden. They had at least six children including the Swedish architect Eugen Thorburn.
