= Audley F. Mahaffey =

American politician

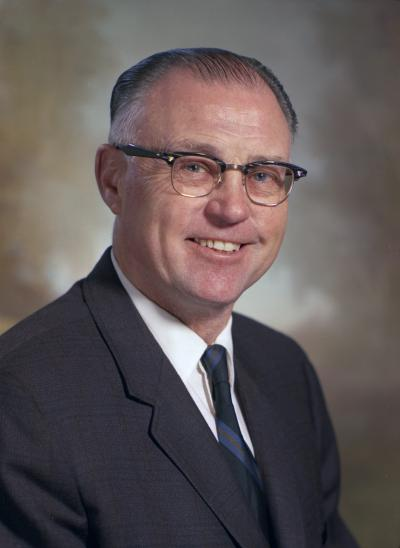
- Mahaffey in 1967

Member of the Washington House of Representatives for the 3rd district
- In office 1945–1949, 1959–1971

Personal details
- Born: December 19, 1899 Pawnee, Oklahoma, United States
- Died: March 1982 (aged 82) Washington, United States
- Party: Republican
- Occupation: educator

Audley Fleming Mahaffey (December 19, 1899 – March 1982) was an American politician in the state of Washington. He served in the Washington House of Representatives from 1945 to 1949 and 1959 to 1971.
