= Dùn Eibhinn =

Coordinates: 56.0706°N 6.2078°W

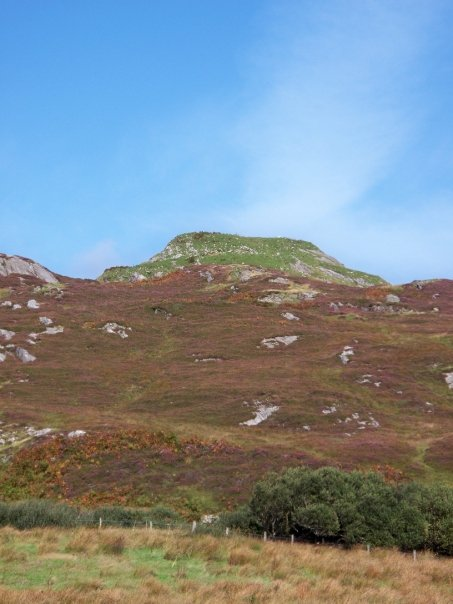
Dùn Eibhinn

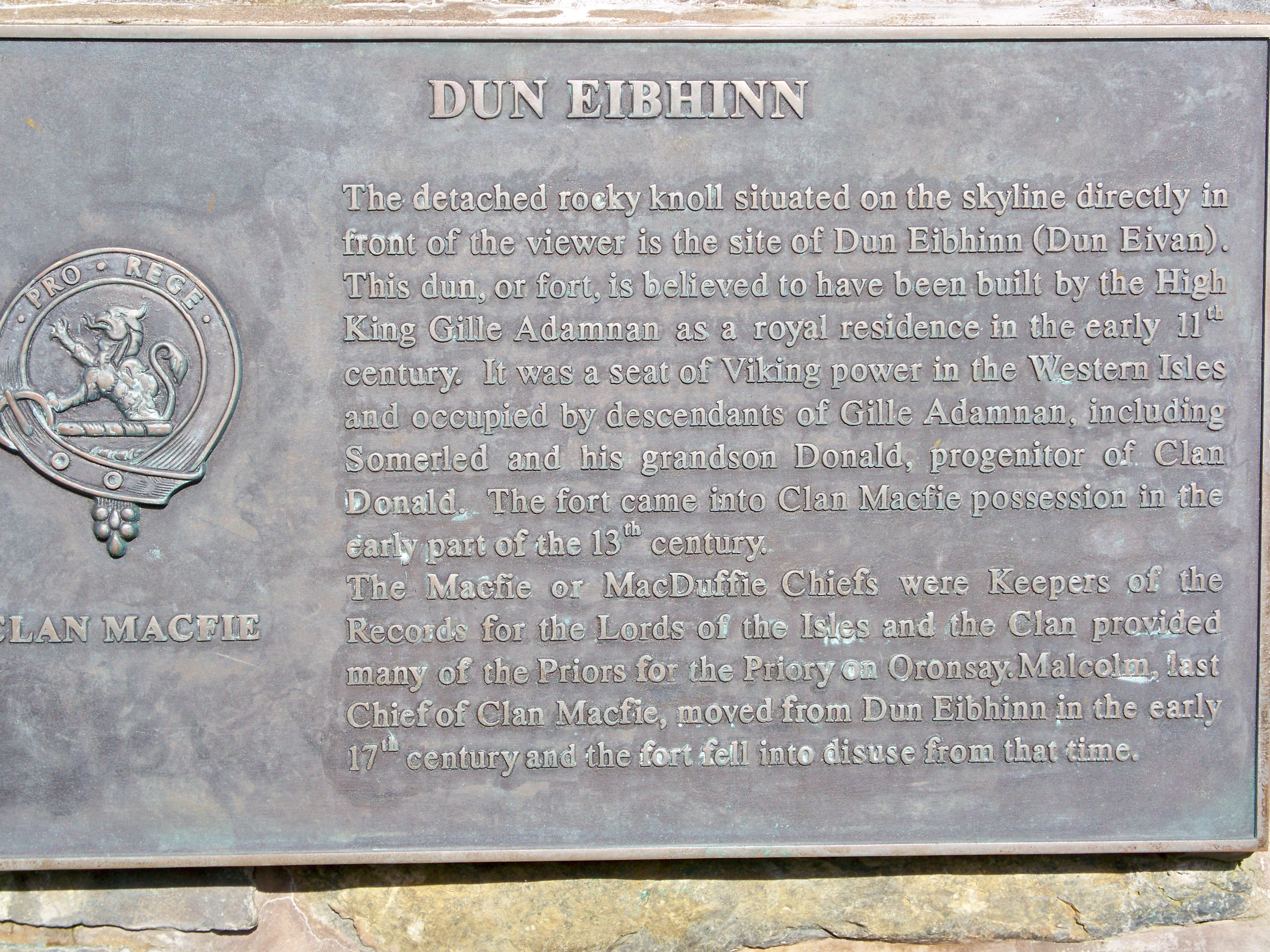
Marker at the base of Dùn Eibhinn

Dùn Eibhinn, also known as Dun Evan, Dun Eivan or Fort of Eyvind, is a hillfort located on the Inner Hebridean island of Colonsay, Scotland. The site is located at grid reference NR38229439.

Believed to have been built as a royal residence in the early 11th century, it was a seat of Viking power in the Hebrides. The fort came into Clan Macfie possession in the early part of the 13th century. In 1623 after Malcolm Macfie of Colonsay, Chief of Clan Macfie was killed in a feud by Coll Mac Gillespick MacDonald, the fort was abandoned and became ruinous.
