= Dev Sanyal =

Indian energy executive

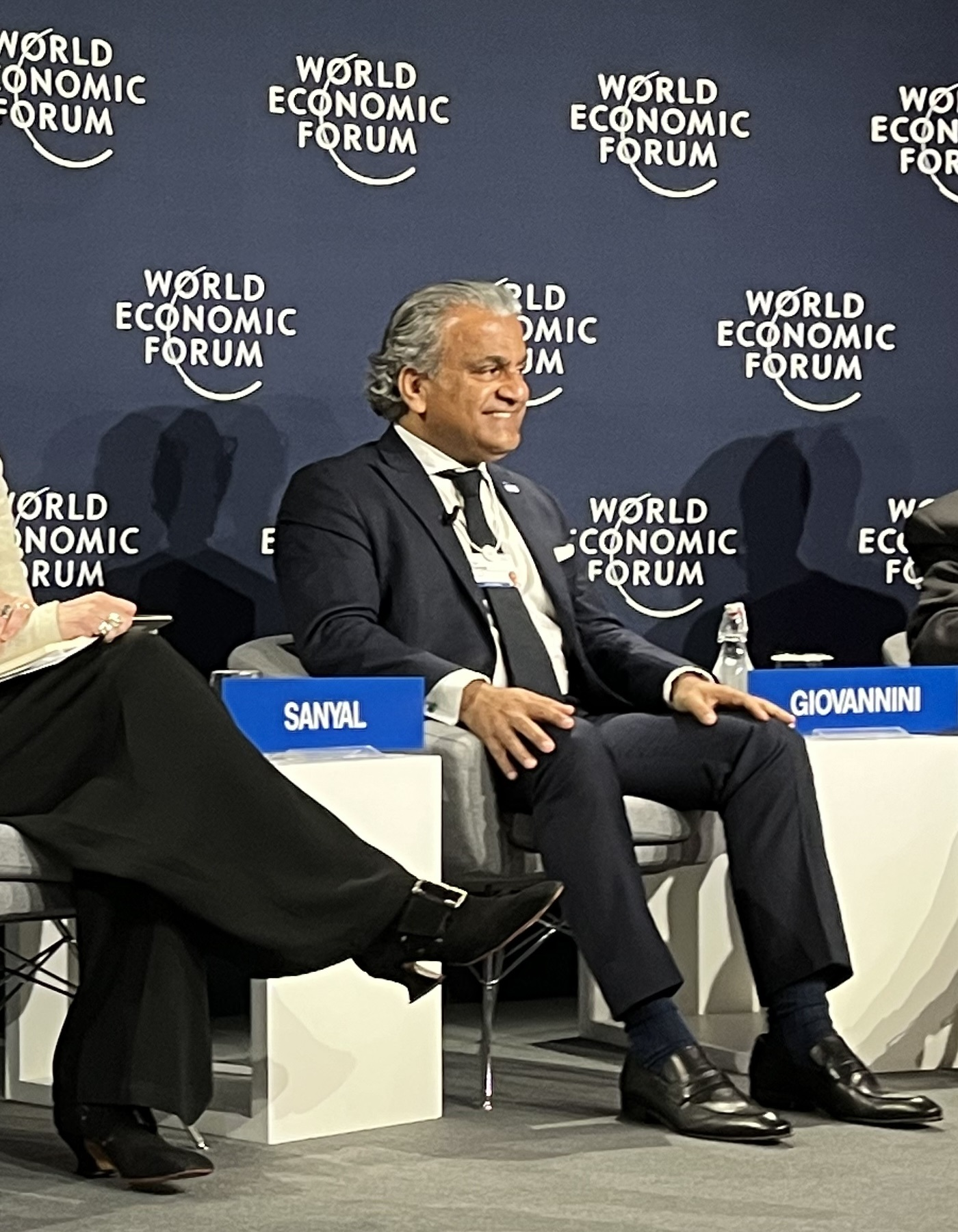
- Sanyal in 2022
- Born: New Delhi
- Education: The Fletcher School of Law and Diplomacy, Tufts University
- Occupation: Group Chief Executive Officer of VAROPreem
- Term: January 2026 —

Dev Sanyal is the Group Chief Executive Officer of VAROPreem, an energy company headquartered in Zug, Switzerland and formed in 2026 through the merger of VARO Energy and Preem. He previously was CEO of VARO Energy from January 2022 and, prior to that, over a decade on the group executive committee of BP.

== Early life and education ==
Dev Sanyal was born in New Delhi, India, and grew up in Darjeeling. His father, K.S.B. Sanyal, was the chairman of the Andrew Yule Group.

Sanyal studied at St. Paul's School, Darjeeling, and St. Stephen's College, Delhi. He graduated from The Fletcher School of Law and Diplomacy at Tufts University with a master's degree in politics and economics. Dev Sanyal is currently a member of the Board of Overseers of the school.

== Career ==
Sanyal is the Group Chief Executive officer of VAROPreem, an energy company formed through the merger of VARO Energy and Preem. He led the completion of VARO Energy's acquisition of Preem to form the newly combined company. Prior to this, he was CEO of VARO Energy from 2022 to 2026.

On January 1, 2022, Sanyal was appointed CEO of VARO Energy. The ONE VARO Transformation strategy, which he unveiled in July 2022, is centred on the “twin-engines” of conventional and sustainable energies and commits to spending two-thirds of capital in sustainable energies to deliver a trebling of earnings by 2026 while delivering 50/50 earnings from both businesses. In January 2026, Sanyal told Reuters that VARO had achieved the growth and profitability targets of its five-year strategy 18 months ahead of schedule.

On March 31, 2025, he announced the acquisition of the Swedish energy company Preem AB. The combined company, VAROPreem, is Europe's third-largest refiner and the second largest renewable fuels producer. On 9 July, 2026, VAROPreem acquired the remaining 74.9% shareholding from existing shareholders of Sunpine AB, the world’s largest raw tall oil biorefinery. Prior to this, he headed BP’s gas and low carbon energy globally and was also accountable for BP’s Europe and Asia regions. During his tenure in the group executive committee, Sanyal built businesses in natural gas and sustainable energy and led the company's energy transition.

Sanyal had a 32-year career with BP plc globally. From 2007 to 2011, he was Group Treasurer and Chair of BP Investment Management. During this period, he led the company's financial defence during the Deepwater Horizon incident. Between 2003 and 2007, Sanyal served as the CEO of Air BP International, and from 1999 to 2002, Sanyal was CEO of BP Eastern Mediterranean. He has extensive experience in trading, business development and managing large-scale operations.

== Memberships ==
Sanyal is an independent non-executive director on the board of M&G plc since May 2022. He was an independent non-executive director of Man Group plc (2013–2022). He is a member of the advisory board of the Centre for European Reform and a Fellow of the Energy Institute.

Prior to this, he was a member of the energy advisory board of the Government of India (2017–2023); Accenture Global Energy Board (2012–2018); Global Council of the International Crisis Group (2012–2020); Vice Chairman, Centre for China in the World Economy, Tsinghua University (2014–2019); The Duke of Edinburgh’s International Award Foundation Business Leaders Group (2012–2015); and Trustee of Career Ready (2007–2013).
