= St. Paul's School, Darjeeling =

Private boarding school in Darjeeling, West Bengal, India

St. Paul's School

Location
- Darjeeling, West Bengal; India
- 27.0325065°N 88.2633448°E

Information
- Type: Private boarding school
- Motto: Moniti Meliora Sequamur; (Having been advised, let us follow higher things)
- Religious affiliation: Church of North India
- Established: 1823; 203 years ago
- Founder: Archdeacon Corrie
- School board: ICSE (year 10); ISC (year 12)
- Rector: Peter Lepcha
- Gender: Boys
- Age: 6 to 18
- Enrollment: 600
- Houses: 12
- Colours: Maroon & Dark blue
- Publication: The Chronicle; The Paulite
- School fees: Approx. 4–5 lakh per annum
- Affiliation: CISCE
- Former pupils: Old Paulites
- Website: stpaulsdarjeeling.edu.in

St. Paul's School is a private boarding school for boys in the town of Darjeeling, West Bengal, India. It is known as "Eton of the East" because it is thought to follow similar cultural and traditional values to Eton College. St. Paul's is one of the oldest public schools in Asia. Entrance tests for admission are held every September. The school follows the ICSE curriculum until class 10 and the ISC curriculum for classes 11 and 12.

== History ==
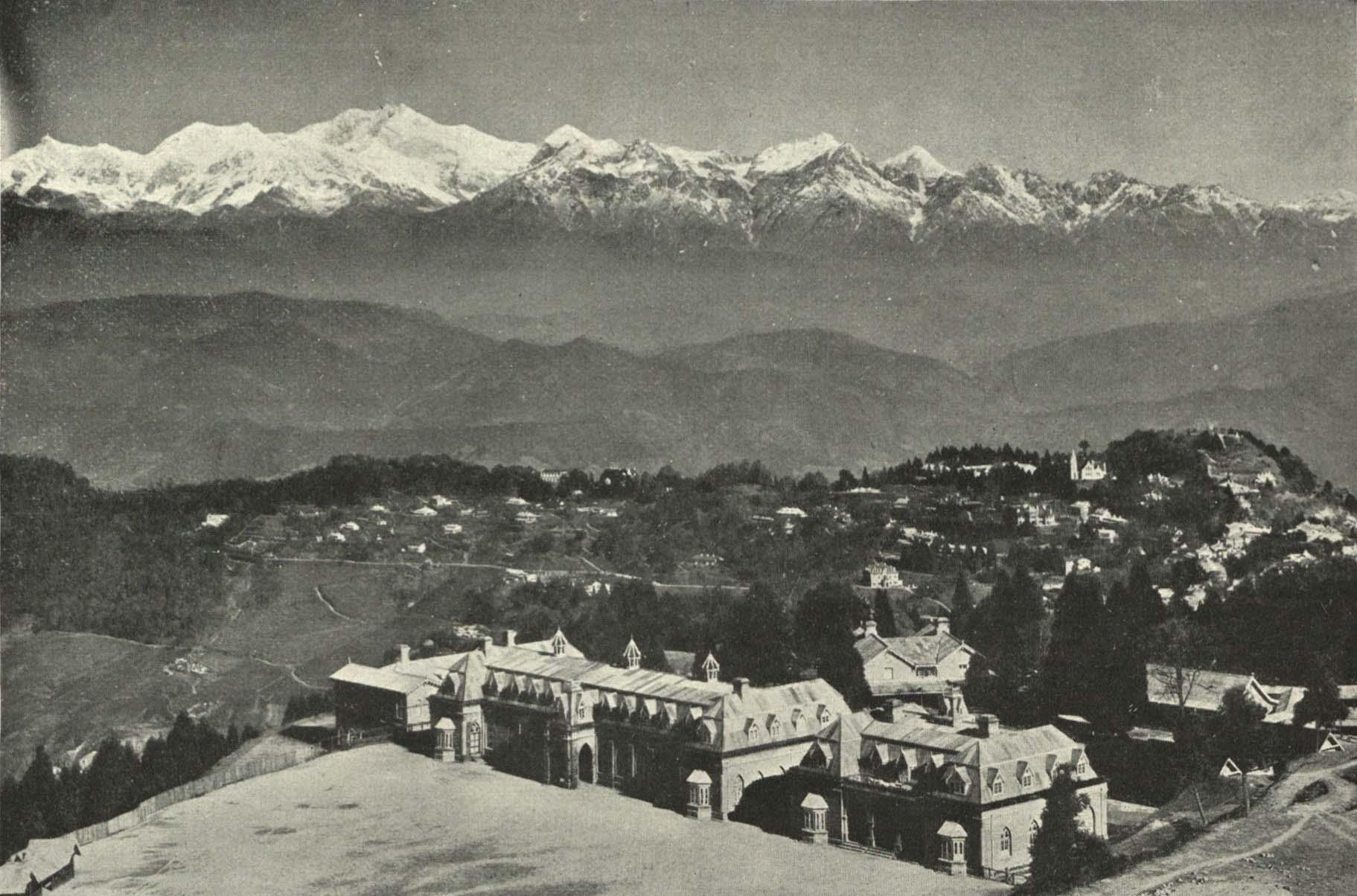
Darjeeling from above St. Paul's School in 1905

St. Paul's School was founded on 1 May 1823 in Calcutta by Daniel Corrie at the instigation of John William Ricketts, a local Anglo-Indian leader. The first principal of the institution was Dr. George Smith. Originally located at 11 Park Street, between the Archbishop House and the Sans Souci Theatre, in 1830 it moved to Jawaharlal Nehru Road, an area now occupied by the Indian Museum. In 1847, it was renamed to St. Paul's School by Bishop Wilson, who had associated the school with St. Paul's Cathedral in Calcutta. It moved to its present Jalapahar estate in Darjeeling in 1864 with 31 boarders and a few day scholars. The estate was purchased from Brian Hodgson for ₹45,000. At that time, at approximately 7,600 feet above sea level, it was the highest school in the world.

A number of its students fought in World War I and World War II.

The school's original purpose was "to supply a good education at a moderate cost to the sons of Europeans and East Indians". After Indian Independence in 1947, it became a school for wealthy Indians and attracted wealthy students from other Asian countries.

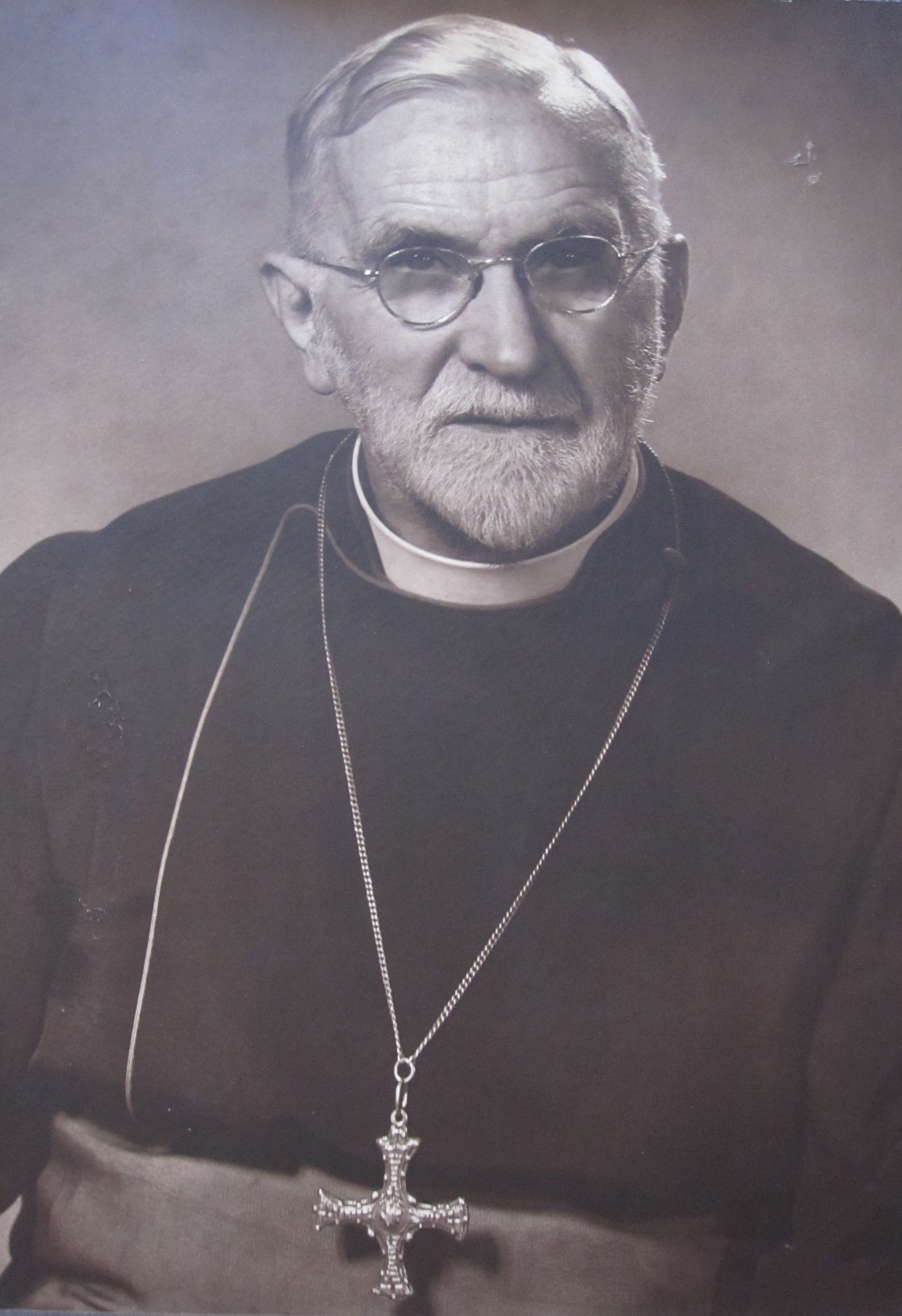
Bishop Foss Westcott

Bishop Foss Westcott, metropolitan of Bengal, Burma and Ceylon, played an important role in the growth of the school. The Maharajah of Burdwan also made important donations. Over the years a number of estates were purchased and merged with the existing school estate. The Mount Vernon Estate, known as Dawkins, was purchased in the early 1900s, and the Terpsithea Estate in 1955.

L.J. Goddard was the longest-serving and perhaps the most important rector, leading the school between 1934 and 1964, including the transition from British rule to independent India. His successors were David Gibbs (1964–1972) and Hari Dang (1977-1984). Dang was awarded the Padma Shri in 1976 for his services in education. Goddard and Gibbs received the OBE for their work at St. Paul's.

== School system ==
The school is divided into Primary, Junior, and Senior wings. The three wings are run independently, with the Primary Wing having its own campus and a slight difference in uniform. The Senior and Junior Wings share many facilities.

The Rector is the head of the school, assisted by the Senior Master, Head Primary Wing, Head Junior Wing, and House masters.

=== Houses ===
Senior Wing

- Clive (named for Robert Clive, first British Governor of the Bengal Presidency)
- Hastings (named for Warren Hastings, first governor of the Presidency of Fort William, and first Governor-General of Bengal)
- Havelock (named for Henry Havelock, British army general)
- Lawrence (named for John Lawrence, Viceroy of India)

Junior Wing

- Anderson (named for John Anderson, 1st Viscount Waverley, Governor of Bengal, a benefactor to the school library)
- Betten (named for Malcolm Betten, tea planter and member of the Board of Governors)
- Cable (named for Ernest Cable, 1st Baron Cable, an old boy and benefactor of the school)
- Westcott (named for Foss Westcott, Bishop of Calcutta)

Primary Wing

- Everest (named for George Everest, British surveyor; or Mount Everest)
- Hunt (named for John Hunt, British mountaineer)
- Hillary (named for Edmund Hillary, New Zealand mountaineer)
- Tenzing (named for Tenzing Norgay, Nepalese-Indian mountaineer)

== Culture ==
The school currently presents itself as a residential school for boys, predominantly Indian, with an "international, multiracial and cross-regional cosmopolitan character", having students from many countries including the US, the UK, France, Thailand, Bhutan, Japan, Bangladesh, Nepal, the United Arab Emirates, and Hong Kong.

Current students are referred to as Paulites and the alumni as Old Paulites. The school lays a great emphasis on uniforms. On off-campus trips, students must dress in prescribed suits and carry umbrellas.

The school motto is derived from a line in the Aeneid, Cedamus Phoebo, et moniti meliora sequamur. Moniti meliora sequamur means "Having been advised, we follow better (higher) things".

The student government is headed by a school captain, assisted by House Captains and Prefects, drawn from the sixth form. The Junior and Primary Wings have their own system of monitors. The sixth form is privileged and enjoys an advantage over the rest. The chapel holds a central place in the life of the school where it meets as a community. There are clubs which develop artistic and technical skills. Each house presents a concert from time to time, apart from the major school production in October.

The extracurricular activities in school include dramatics, elocution, debate, piano, guitar, drums, violin, marching band, and sitar classes. There are various hobby clubs and societies. These are all run by the boys under the supervision of masters. In the Senior Wing, the hobbies are art and crafts, Batik, Indian Western music, model-making, photography, wood and lathe work, cybernetics, textile design, and cooking. The school sends candidates for the music and speech examinations held by the Trinity College London and Royal Academy of Music. The boys are also sent on educational tours to NASA and other historical sites in India and neighbouring countries.

The sport curriculum is dominated by football, cricket, athletics, volleyball, basketball, squash, table tennis, tennis, Eton fives, gymnastics, and rocking climbing.

There has been a long-standing rivalry between St. Paul's and St.Joseph's School, North Point in sports and other activities that the two compete in.

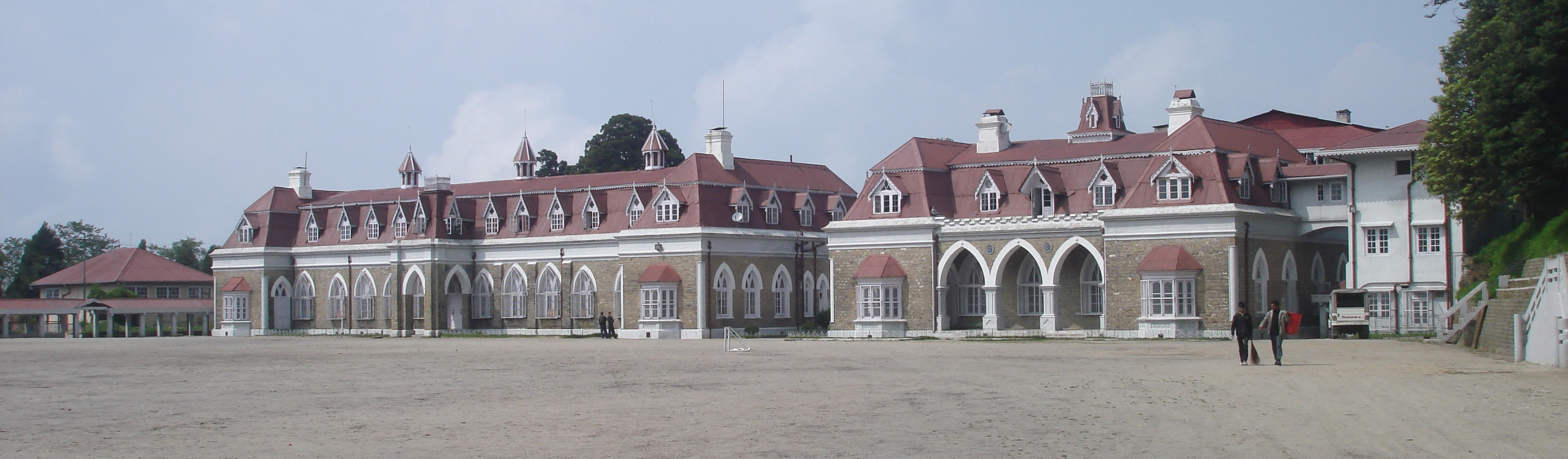
Cotton and Milman Halls

== Awards and recognition ==
St Paul's has been ranked first among boarding schools in West Bengal and fourth in India according to the 2019 Education World rankings. The school was featured in Forbes India magazine in an article titled "The great Indian Schools - 2018". It was named among the top seven boarding schools in India in 2020 by India Today.

== Gallery ==
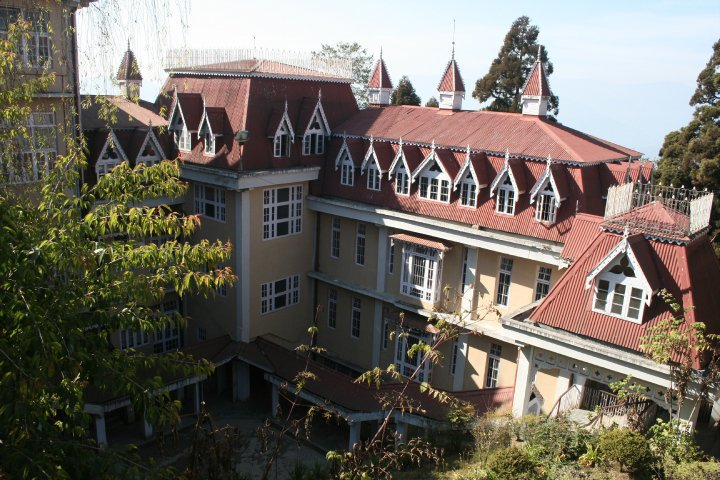
Howard Block

== Notable alumni ==
- Sanjib Banerjee, former Chief Justice of the Meghalaya High court and Madras High Court
- Frank Blaker, Victoria Cross recipient; in 3rd Battalion, 9th Gurkha Rifles, the khas battalion in the Indian Army during World War II
- Anand Burman, Indian businessman, chairman of Dabur
- Ajay Chhibber, first Director General of India's Independent Evaluation Office (with the status of a union Minister of State), former Assistant Secretary-General of the United Nations (UN), head of the Asia-Pacific division of the UNDP
- Manish Choudhary, Bollywood actor
- Stanley Connors, flying ace with the Royal Air Force during the Second World War
- Swapan Dasgupta, columnist, Member of Parliament, Padma Bhushan
- A R Shamsud Doha, Bangladesh Minister of Foreign Affairs, former Ambassador to Yugoslavia, Iran and the United Kingdom; former Minister for Information
- Kelly Dorji, actor and author
- Anjan Dutt, Indian film director, actor, and singer-songwriter
- George Emmett, test cricketer for England, Captain of the Gloucestershire cricket team, 1955–1958
- Kaizad Gustad, Bollywood director and author
- Khwaja Habibullah, the fifth Nawab of Dhaka
- Peter Hildreth, Olympian
- Mahesh Jethmalani, lawyer and senior council, Supreme Court of India and senior member of BJP Party.

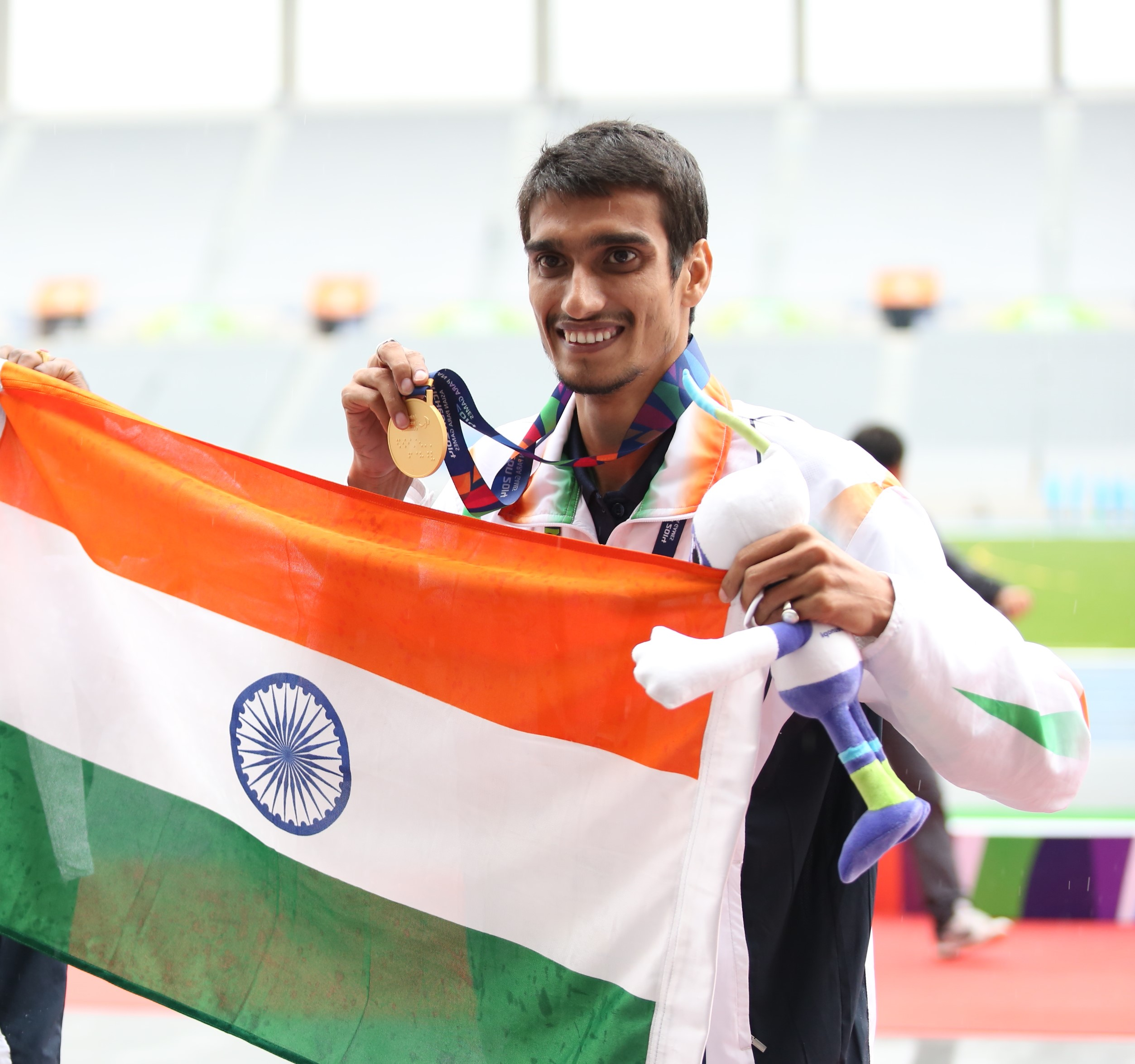
Sharad Kumar (athlete) , 2014 Para Asian Games

- Sharad Kumar, Paralympic Games high jumper, Olympian

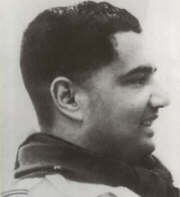
Karun Krishna Majumdar

- Karun Krishna Majumdar, during World War II, the first Indian to achieve the rank of wing commander in the Indian Air Force
- James McMullan, artist, illustrator, educator; received Drama Desk Special Award in 1991 and Hamilton King Award
- R. J. Minney, British film producer, journalist, editor and author
- Rajeev Mohta, team gold medalist and individual silver medalist in golf at the 1982 Asian Games
- Tashi Namgyal, longest-reigning Chogyal (king) of Sikkim (r. 1914-63), who signed the 1950 treaty giving India suzerainty over Sikkim
- Sidkeong Tulku Namgyal, Maharaja and Chogyal of Sikkim
- Jamling Tenzing Norgay, mountain climber, author, recipient of National Citizen award
- Samiran Nundy, founder editor of the National Medical Journal of India and Tropical Gastroenterology, recipient of India's Padma Shri
- Prithvi Raj Singh Oberoi, Executive Chairman of EIH Hotels, The Oberoi Group; Padma Vibhushan
- Maj. Gen. D. K. Palit, Vir Chakra recipient for commanding the 9th Gorkha Rifles, author
- Lalat Indu Parija, IAS, former Chief Secretary of Odisha, author, captained Odisha cricket team in the Ranji Trophy.
- Paul Raschid, Olympian in boxing
- Rustum Roy, physicist in the field of chemistry and materials sciences with 21 nominations for the Nobel Prize; awarded with Order of the Rising Sun by the Emperor of Japan
- Subroto Roy (economist)- Indian economist, former economic advisor to late Rajiv Gandhi
- Dev Sanyal, Group CEO of VAROPreem
- Ammar Siamwalla, Thai economist, former President of Thailand Development Research Institute, author
- Farooq Sobhan, diplomat, Foreign Secretary of Bangladesh
- Rehman Sobhan, Bangladeshi economist and freedom fighter
- Vishnu Som, senior editor and principal anchor with New Delhi Television
- Tashi Tenzing, mountain climber

== Films shot at St. Paul's School ==
The school has been featured in Hindi and Bengali language films including:

1. Hamraaz (1967) by B. R. Chopra
2. Mera Naam Joker (1970) by Raj Kapoor
3. Seemabaddha (1971) by Satyajit Ray
4. Do Anjaane (1976) by Dulal Guha
5. Bada Din (2000)
6. Main Hoon Na (2004) by Farah Khan
7. Chowrasta Crossroads of Love (2009) by Anjan Dutta
8. Barfi! (2012)
9. Jagga Jasoos (2017) by Anurag Basu
10. Raja the Great (2017) by Anil Ravipudi
11. Petta (2019) by Karthik Subbaraj
12. Mithya (2022) by Rohan Sippy

Hollywood actress Vivien Leigh was born on the school campus (present day Dawkins, cottage beside the basketball court) in November 1913.

== See also ==
- Education in India
- Education in West Bengal
- List of schools in India
