= Nundy =

Nundy is a surname. Notable people with the surname include:

- Jeff Nundy (born 1935), English football player
- Karuna Nundy (born 1976), Indian lawyer
- Samiran Nundy, Indian surgeon, medical academic, and writer

== See also ==
- Nandy (surname)
