= Subroto Roy =

Subroto Roy may refer to:

- Subroto Roy (economist)
- Subrata Roy, Founder and Chairman of the Sahara India Pariwar
