= VAROPreem =

Swiss company

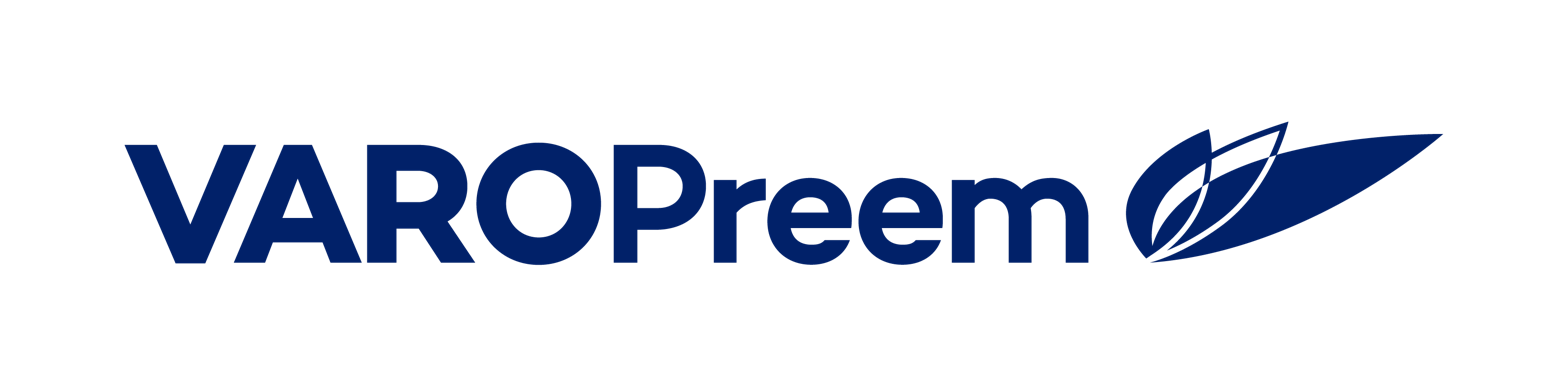
- Formerly: VARO Energy
- Type: Private
- Industry: Energy
- Founded: 2012; 14 years ago (as VARO Energy); 2026; 0 years ago (as VAROPreem)
- Headquarters: Zug, canton of Zug, Switzerland
- Area served: principally Europe
- Key people: Dev Sanyal (CEO)
- Website: https://www.varopreem.com

VAROPreem is a leading energy company based in Zug, Switzerland, formed through the combination of VARO Energy and Preem AB. Dev Sanyal is the Group Chief Executive Officer of VAROPreem. On 9 July, 2026, VAROPreem acquired the remaining 74.9% shareholding from existing shareholders of Sunpine AB, the world’s largest raw tall oil biorefinery. The business was subsequently renamed VAROPreem Sunpine.

The company operates across the integrated energy value chain - from manufacturing and sourcing to storage, distribution, marketing, and trading with a portfolio that spans both conventional and sustainable energies.

VAROPreem owns and operates critical infrastructure essential to Europe's energy security. It is the third-largest independent refiner in the region and the second-largest renewable fuels producer in Europe, and one of the top six globally.

Its integrated business includes six manufacturing hubs and access to more than 120 terminals, serving a broad base of mobility and industrial customers across 33 countries. The company supplies 10% of Europe's road and marine fuel demand through its integrated supply and distribution network.

In Sweden, the company operates Lysekil and Gothenburg manufacturing hubs. In Germany, it holds a majority interest in both Neustadt and Vohburg refineries. The company owns the only refinery in Switzerland in Cressier refinery and is an 80% shareholder in the world-scale biogas manufacturing facility at Coevorden in The Netherlands. Combined, these six manufacturing hubs have a processing capacity of 530 kbd of conventional fuels, 1.3mtpa of renewable fuels and 450 GWh of biogas. VAROPreem also owns 100% share in elexon, a leading European developer of commercial vehicle charging.

The company supplies 10% of Europe's road and marine fuel demand through its integrated supply and distribution network.

Marcel van Poecke is the chair of the supervisory board. Dev Sanyal is the Group Chief Executive Officer and was appointed on 1 January 2022 as CEO in the predecessor VARO Energy. Prior to this, he served over a decade on the group executive committee of BP in a 32-year career in the company.

== History ==
=== 2012 ===
VARO Energy was created with the acquisition of a Swiss refinery from Petroplus located in Cressier, alongside marketing and storage activities. It was established as a joint venture between the commodity trader Vitol (75%) and Atlas Invest (25%), a financial holding company owned by the leading energy investor, Marcel van Poecke, who remains the Chairman of the then newly created firm.

=== 2013 ===
VARO Energy' shareholder base was restructured; in place of Atlas Invest, the financial investor Carlyle takes a 50 percent stake In Germany, it acquired Petrotank and Vitol Marketing Germany.

=== 2014 ===
VARO became the owner of 45% of the Bayernoil refinery in Germany through the acquisition of shares held by OMV Deutschland GmbH in Bayernoil Raffineriegesellschaft GmbH and other downstream assets owned by OMV Deutschland GmbH.

The company acquired Total's heating oil business and general trade business in Switzerland (Huiles Minérales, Mazol, Portales & Bonnet CH). The purchased assets include tank storage facilities in Eclépens near Lausanne and Total's entire end customer distribution and sales network for domestic heating oil and diesel in Switzerland.

Roger Brown is appointed CEO of VARO.

=== 2015 ===
It invested over CHF 50 million in the Cressier refinery, the most significant investment in the site's history, allowing it to remain competitive in the long term. The investment is focused on safety, asset integrity and growth, with projects including a partial conversion of the refinery's energy sourcing to natural gas, a cleaner source of energy, and technical upgrades to allow for the production of gasoline containing up to 5% ethanol produced from renewable sources.

In addition to purchasing bunkering activities from Vitol in Germany, VARO acquired the German wholesale distributors Marol and Gekol.

VARO merged with Dutch-based company Argos leading to gaining full ownership of Rhytank AG, located in Switzerland. Reggeborgh, a private Dutch investment company, enters as a third shareholder with 1/3 participation each.

=== 2016 ===
The company took full control over two tank storage terminals in the Netherlands: Hydrocarbon Hotel and Enviem Terminal. VARO expanded its inland bunkering activities by acquiring Fiwado B.V. in the Netherlands.

=== 2017 ===
VARO acquired 100% of shares of Inter Oil B.V., a holding company, expanding retail activities in the Netherlands by gaining the brand names Brand Oil and Amigo. The company acquired the assets of Schneider Mineralöl Meissen GmbH. (retail and direct sales) in Saxony.

It expanded its retail network in the Netherlands with the purchase of United Fuel Group B.V. gaining additional fuel stations.

Hydrocarbon Hotel Tankstorage Terminal, purchased in 2016, is sold to Global Petro Storage. The former Petrotank terminal situated in Hanau in Germany is sold to Adolf Roth GmbH & Co. KG.

=== 2018 ===
VARO purchased Van den Belt gaining several fuel stations in the process. The firm acquired Gerber Energie GmbH & retail sites from Wengel & Dettelbacher, and the terminal in Brugges, Belgium.

=== 2019 ===
VARO acquired 100% of the shares in SMD Beheer BV, a Calpam-group company, adding 19 Calpam branded stations to its Dutch retail network.

=== 2020 ===
VARO added an additional 6.4% to its stake in Bayernoil, making the company the majority stakeholder with 51.4%.

=== 2021 ===
Carlyle completes an acquisition of the stake in VARO to hold 66.66% of shares in the company.

After buying 51% of the shares in SilviCarbon, VARO announces that the company has signed an agreement to acquire 49,5 % of the shares in E-Flux, a Dutch technology company that provides software for electric vehicle charging.

=== 2022 ===
With Dev Sanyal appointed as the new CEO of VARO, the company and Group E announced the plan to build the most powerful ground-mounted solar facility in Switzerland, in Cressier. Furthermore, VARO and GPS Group announced the completion of an integrated biofuels facility in the port of Amsterdam.

The firm announced a new strategy to invest 3.5 billion and help customers meet net zero.

=== 2023 ===
In the year that it signs a Memorandum of Understanding with Deutsche Lufthansa AG to explore the production and supply of Sustainable Aviation Fuel (SAF), VARO announces the acquisition of 80% of the shares of one of the largest European biogas manufacturers, the Dutch company Bio Energy Coevorden BV.

VARO Energy increases its shareholding in Road (E-Flux) to 66.3% and commits significant investment for new market entry in France, Italy, Spain and the UK, and market expansion in Germany. It acquires 100% of the share capital in Renewable Energy Services (RES), one of Europe's leading biogas trading companies, and expands biogas trading capabilities across 10 European countries.

In addition to partnering with Höegh Autoliners to accelerate Sustainable Shipping, the company announced its plan to invest $600 million to build a major SAF manufacturing facility in Rotterdam, which will meet up to 7% of the EU's 2030 SAF target. VARO, Groupe E and CSEM commissioned Switzerland's largest ground-mounted solar power facility, in Cressier and connected a district heating network using excess heat from the Cressier manufacturing hub.

=== 2024 ===
VARO Energy acquires 100% of elexon GmbH, a leading European electric vehicle charging infrastructure provider. VARO Charging partners with Truckparkings Rotterdam, to operate new e-truck charging hub in the Port of Rotterdam.

VARO and Orim Energy partner to scale-up sustainable shipping fuel capabilities. Gunvor Group announces its plans to join VARO's large-scale SAF manufacturing facility project in Rotterdam.

=== 2025 ===
In March, VARO announced it reached an agreement to acquire Preem by purchasing 100% of the shares in its parent company, Corral Petroleum Holdings AB, in an all-cash transaction. The deal is expected to close in the second half of 2025, pending the usual closing conditions and regulatory approvals.

== Creation of VAROPreem (2026) ==
=== 2026 ===
Following regulatory approval, VARO completed the acquisition of Preem on January 16, leading to the creation of VAROPreem. The new company owns the Lysekil and Gothenburg manufacturing hubs in Sweden, the Cressier manufacturing hub in Switzerland, supported by an expanded distribution and logistics network.

The combined company also includes VARO's existing majority stake in the Neustadt and Vohburg (Bayernoil) manufacturing hub in Germany and an 80% interest in the large-scale biogas facility in Coevorden, the Netherlands.

== Operations ==
VAROPreem operates an extensive energy supply network across Europe, comprising manufacturing facilities, storage terminals, deep-water ports, and distribution assets. The system connects six manufacturing hubs, more than 120 terminals, and a range of retail and inland bunkering sites.

This integrated network enables the company's conventional fuel supply activities and provides the scale for the development and distribution of renewable fuels and lower-carbon energy solutions. The firm also has access to storage, blending, and distribution infrastructure serving road transport, aviation, marine, and industrial customers.

Its refining system includes the Cressier refinery in Switzerland and the Gothenburg and Lysekil refineries in Sweden. It also holds a majority stake in the Neustadt and Vohburg manufacturing hub (Bayernoil) in Germany, and an 80% interest in the biogas facility at Coevorden in the Netherlands.

The company owns 100% of elexon, a European developer of commercial vehicle charging infrastructure; and 67.9% of Road, an electric-vehicle charging platform provider.

== Leadership ==
VAROPreem is led by Dev Sanyal, as Group Chief Executive Officer. He previously served as CEO of VARO Energy from 1 January 2022 and held senior leadership roles at BP spanning 32 years.

The company's leadership team brings together executives from the former VARO and Preem organisations.

- Magnus Heimburg, Deputy Chief Executive Officer and EVP Markets & Customers
- Georges Menane, EVP and Group Chief Financial Officer
- Hugues Bourgogne, EVP Manufacturing, Projects & Technology
- Stewart Peter, EVP Trading & Optimisation
- Theo Pannekeet, EVP Sustainable Energies Value Chain
- Eric Westerholm, EVP Strategy & Transformation
- Susanne Stenman, EVP Data & Information Technology
- Gilles Vollin, EVP Integration, People & Communication

== Sustainability ==
VAROPreem pursues a sustainability strategy that builds on the activities previously developed by VARO Energy and Preem, with a focus on biofuels, biogas and e-mobility. The combined company has a renewable fuels processing capacity of approximately 1.3 million tonnes per annum (mtpa), making VAROPreem the second-largest renewable fuels producer in Europe.

Its strategy is built on two complementary engines – Engine 1 for conventional and Engine 2 for sustainable energies. 50% of the company's earnings are currently coming from its sustainable energies business.

VAROPreem is also working to reduce emissions across its operations by upgrading and repurposing existing assets. This includes measures such as efficiency improvements, energy-saving initiatives and the expansion of renewable fuel production capacity through the co-processing of renewable feedstocks at its refineries.

It engages with customers across road transport, marine, aviation and industrial sectors to support the adoption of lower-carbon energy alternatives.

With renewables, VAROPreem refer to biofuel and LNG. LNG results in a 25% reduction in Greenhouse gas emissions compared to coal. VAROPreem owns the company Sunpine who manufactures tall oil which is being utilized in order to increase the renewable part in fossil fuel. Biofuels are commonly considered to emit less greenhouse gas than fossil fuel. The origins of biofuel is organic matter, which has the capacity to store carbon dioxide, which then in calculations reduces the sum of carbon dioxide emissions into the atmosphere, resulting in a mathemetical zero-sum game.

In 2018 Preem contributed with emissions of 60 Million tonnes carbon dioxide, of which 83% came from the utilization or consumption of the company's petroleum products. In 2026, fossil fuels account for 69% of total greenhouse gas emissions globally. All forms of greenhouse gas emissions need to be drastically and immediately reduced in order to mitigate global warming. Like several other fossil fuel companies who nonetheless wish to refer to themselves as sustainable, VAROPreem emphasize how they make efforts to reduce these emissions, or how petroleum products currently are necessary. This has been labelled "climate obstruction", referring to an actor that recognizes global warming but simultaneously continues their activities that are damaging for the climate or that obstructs mitigating activities. An analysis of Preem's sustainability reports show that the company is aware of how "its environmental performance does not alight with its environmental communication" (p. 6), that the Preem aims to redefine what environmental sustainability means, in so-called greenwashing, and that there is no evidence that Preem actually work towards any sustainable solutions beyond the legal minimum requirements.

VAROPreems oil refineries in Sweden in Lysekil and Gothenburg account for a large part of Sweden's emissions of greenhouse gas emissions. During 2024, the activity at Swedish refineries, the burning of industrial gas at the refineries and the distribution of oil, accounted for emissions of 2.7 million tonnes of carbon dioxide. Of these, two million tones of carbon dioxide are emitted by refineries owned by VAROPreem.

== Greenwashing ==
During 2019 and 2020, Preem was engaged in a greenwashing campaign, defined as a misleading communication concerning environmental and climate related issues, with the aim of enabling business-as-usual. Preem made several statements concerning the environmental sustainability of their products and their company, among other things concerning the benefits of utilizing biofuel, concerning the production process of their petroleum products, and concerning their still non-existent technique for capturing carbon dioxide from the atmosphere. The carbon capture technique may play an important but limited part in ambitions to become climate neutral. However, the carbon dioxide that can be captured comes from the production process only. The rest comes from other parts of the value chain such as the utilization of the products that VAROPreem produces and sells.

The Friends of the Earth rewarded Preem with the Swedish greenwashing award in 2019, with the motivation that Preem had more than other companies made an effort to create a green image despite the emissions resulting from their activities and products, and promised more than they could live up to concerning environmental actions. The research and media analysis network De Smog concluded that Preem more than other European fossil fuel companies marketed themselves as green or sustainable on social media and simultaneously omitting that 98% of their business was founded on petroleum products. Preem was found guilty of misleading advertisement by the Swedish advertising ombudsman, after they had published an advertisement that looked like a news article, where Preem claimed that the emissions would be lower if they enlarged their refinery in Lysekil.

== See also ==
- Preem (legacy page)
