= Lalat Indu Parija =

Indian cricketer (died 2019)

Lalat Indu Parija (died 26 August 2019) was an Indian cricket player and civil servant. He played 20 first-class matches for Odisha in Ranji Trophy. He was also the former chief secretary of Odisha for two terms in 1983 and later in 1986. His autobiography "Fate Takes a Hand" highlighting his 40 years of work as an administrator was published in March 2019. Parija was the son of scientist Prana Krushna Parija.

He graduated from high school at the St. Paul's School, Darjeeling and from college at the St. Stephen's College, Delhi.

Parija died on 26 August 2019 at the age of 89 in a private hospital in Cuttack of acute chest pain.
