= Port of Gothenburg =

- Interactive map of Port of Gothenburg

Location
- Country: Sweden
- Location: Gothenburg
- Coordinates: 57.7°N 11.93°E
- UN/LOCODE: SEGOT

Statistics
- Vessel arrivals: 11,000 ships
- Annual cargo tonnage: 39 million tons (2019)
- Annual container volume: 762 902 TEU (2019)
- Passenger traffic: 1 675 341 (2019)
- Website www.portofgothenburg.com

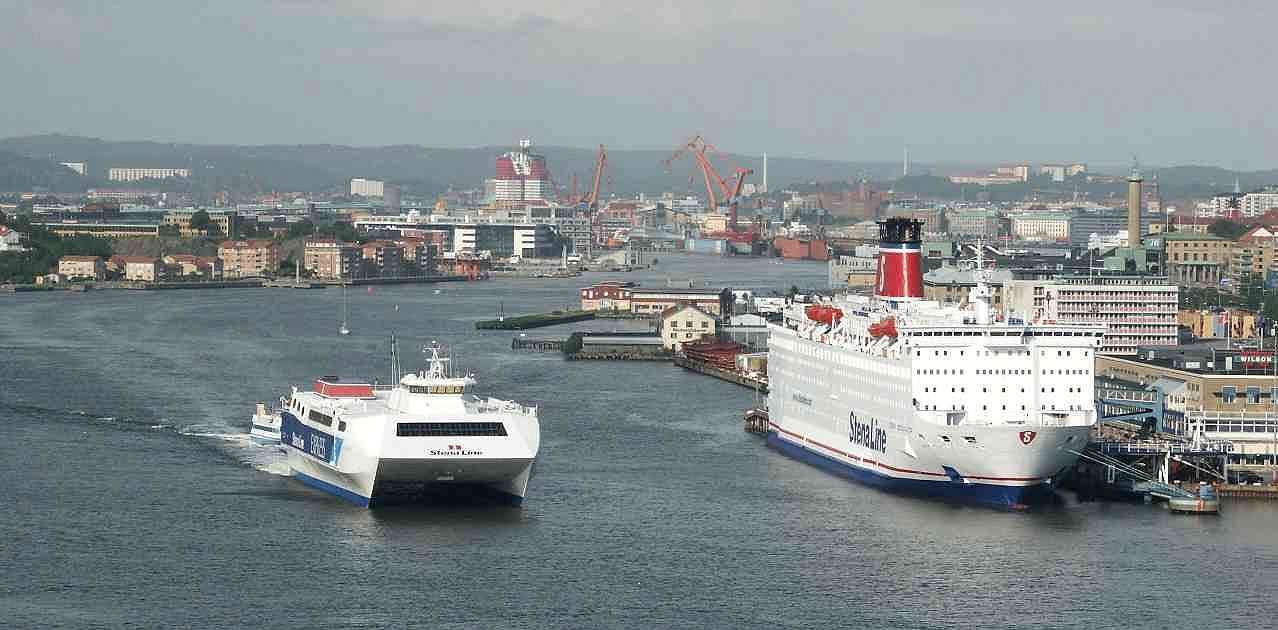
The river-part of the port as seen from the Älvsborg Bridge

Drone footage of Gothenburg harbour

The municipally owned Port of Gothenburg (Swedish: Göteborgs hamn) is the largest port in the Nordic countries, with over 11,000 ship visits per year from over 140 destinations worldwide. As the only Swedish port with the capacity to cope with the very largest modern, ocean-going container ships, Gothenburg handles nearly 30% of the country's foreign trade, comprising 39 million tonnes of freight per year.

== Geography ==
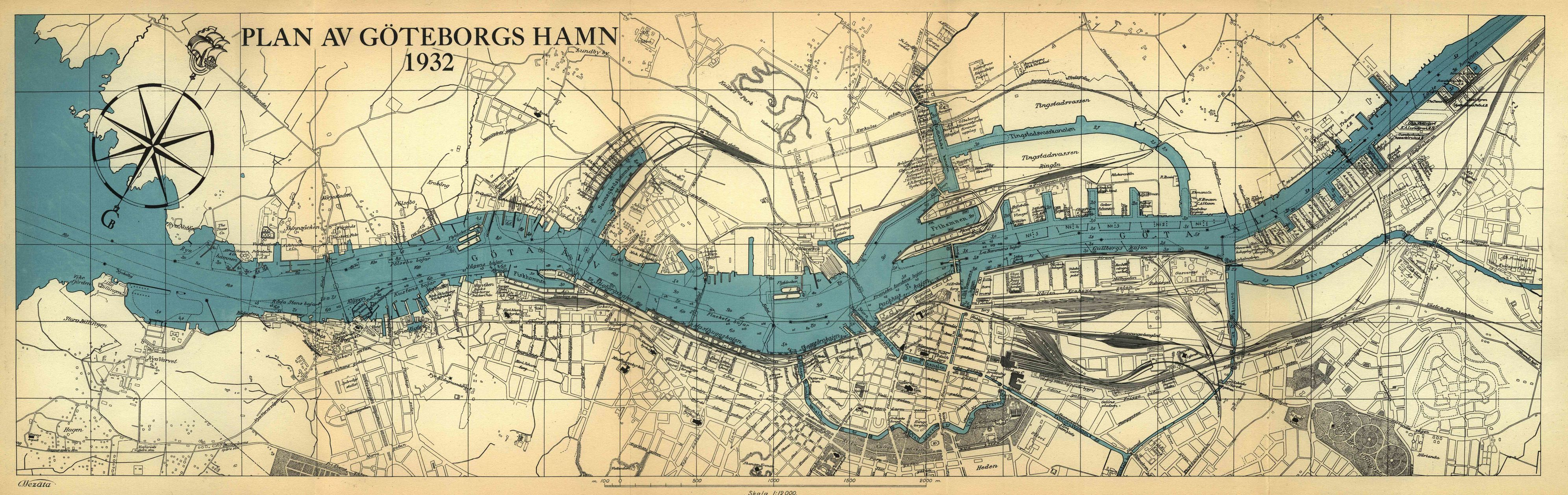
The port in 1932

The port is situated on both sides of the estuary of Göta älv in Gothenburg. The north shore, Norra Älvstranden, is on Hisingen island and the south shore, Södra Älvstranden, is on the mainland. It is a combined river and coastal port, and the total length of the dock is 13.1 km (8.1 mi).

== Port sections ==
The port is divided into a number of sections or harbors.

South shore

- Älvnabbens petroleumhamn, (older)
- Tånguddens hamn
- Nya Varvet, (older)
- Carnegiekajen, (older) dock length 225 m (738 ft), depth 5.4–7.5 m (18–25 ft)
- Klippan, (older)
- Majnabbehamnen, dock length 485 m (1,591 ft), depth 3–8 m (9.8–26.2 ft)
- Varvet Kusten (older)
- Göteborgs fiskhamn
- Gamla Varvet, (older)
- Stigbergskajen, dock length 496 m (1,627 ft), depth 7–9 m (23–30 ft)
- Masthuggskajen, dock length 927 m (3,041 ft), depth 6.3–7.6 m (21–25 ft)
- Skeppsbrokajen, dock length 150 m (490 ft), depth 3 m (9.8 ft)
- Stenpiren, dock length 215 m (705 ft), depth 3–6 m (9.8–19.7 ft)
- Stora Hamnen/Stora Hamnkanalen, (older)
- Packhuskajen, dock length 230 m (750 ft), depth 3 m (9.8 ft)
- Lilla Bommen
- Gullbergskajen, dock length 1,294 m (4,245 ft), depth 3–5.8 m (9.8–19.0 ft)
- Gasverkskajen, (older) dock length 255 m (837 ft), depth 5.8 m (19 ft)
- Lärjehamnen, (older) dock length 310 m (1,020 ft), depth 3.6–5.3 m (12–17 ft)
- Rosenlundskanalen

North shore

- Torshamnen, dock length 630 m (2,070 ft), depth 20.5 m (67 ft)
- Torshamnen, dock length 250 m (820 ft), depth 6.5 m (21 ft)
- Arendal, dock length 450 m (1,480 ft), depth 8 m (26 ft)
- Älvsborgshamnen, dock length 1,246 m (4,088 ft), depth 9–11 m (30–36 ft)
- Skandiahamnen, dock length 2,200 m (7,200 ft), depth 6–14.2 m (20–47 ft)
- Skarvikshamnen, dock length 1,735 m (5,692 ft), depth 7–13 m (23–43 ft)
- Ryahamnen, dock length 1,275 m (4,183 ft), depth 3.5–9.5 m (11–31 ft)
- Eriksbergshamnen
- Sannegårdshamnen, (older) dock length 890 m (2,920 ft), depth 7–7.5 m (23–25 ft)
- Lindholmshamnen, (older) dock length 908 m (2,979 ft), depth 4.2–9 m (14–30 ft)
- Lundbyhamnen, dock length 680 m (2,230 ft), depth 8 m (26 ft)
- Frihamnen, dock length 1,937 m (6,355 ft), depth 6–9.5 m (20–31 ft)
- Ringökajen, dock length 195 m (640 ft), depth 3 m (9.8 ft)
- Kvarnen Tre Lejon, (older) dock length 310 m (1,020 ft), depth 3–9 m (9.8–29.5 ft)

== Capacity and cargo ==
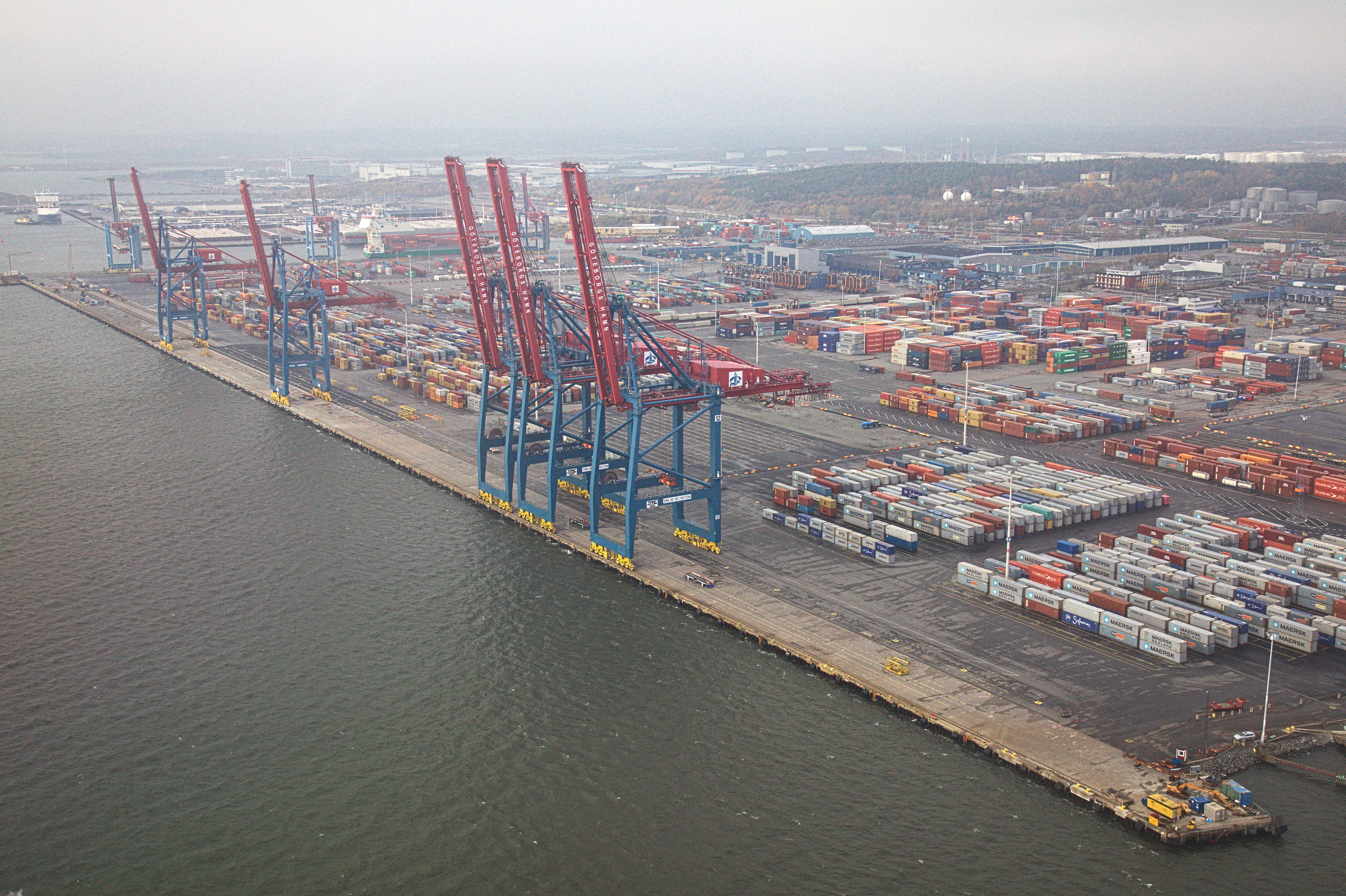
North side of the coastal part of the port, Skandiahamnen

In 2013 the port handled approximately 860,000 containers (TEU) and 160,000 new cars (both import and export). It has 24 scheduled rail freight shuttles, serving Norway and Sweden.

The primary imports are crude oil (20 million tonnes in 2013), textiles and food. The primary exports are new vehicles (trucks, cars, buses, heavy plant), steel and paper. There are specialised terminals for containers, ro-ro, cars, passengers (1.7 million in 2013) and oil and other energy products.

The port is large and deep enough to accommodate even very large ships, such as the Maya of the Mediterranean Shipping Company that arrived at the port on 21 December 2015. It was then the world's largest container ship, 396 m (1,299 ft) long with a draft of 16 m (52 ft) and a 19,224 TEU capacity. On March 31, 2026, the port acquired a large land area (210,000 square metres) on its outer zone as part of its expansion strategy.

== See also ==
- APM Terminals
- Bergslagernas Järnvägar
- List of busiest ports in Europe
- Maersk Triple E class
- Preemraff Göteborg
- Roll-on-roll-off discharge facility
- Viking (barque)
- Vinga (Gothenburg)
- Volvo
