= Ajay Chhibber =

Indian economist

- Education: St Stephen's College, Delhi (BA, 1974); Delhi School of Economics (MA, 1976); Stanford University (PhD, 1983)
- Occupations: Economist, civil servant
- Employer(s): Government of India; UNDP; World Bank; George Washington University
- Notable work: 1997 World Development Report (lead author)
- Title: Director General of the Independent Evaluation Organisation; Former United Nations Assistant Secretary-General
- Awards: David Rajaram Prize (1974)

Ajay Chhibber is the first Director General of India's Independent Evaluation Organisation with the status of Minister of State, recently established to assess the effectiveness of India's development programs. From July 2008 to July 2013 for five years he was former United Nations Assistant Secretary-General and Assistant Administrator for the United Nations Development Programme (UNDP).

He did his schooling from St. Paul's School, Darjeeling. Chhibber received his training as an economist at Stanford University, USA (PhD, 1983) under a University fellowship and at Delhi School of Economics, India (MA, 1976). He received a BA in Economics from St Stephen's College, Delhi University where he received the David Rajaram Prize for the best all - rounder in 1974.

At UNDP, Chhibber managed the Asia-Pacific programmes covering 39 countries spanning from Iran to the islands in the South Pacific. At UNDP he supervised preparation of seminal Human Development Reports on Women and on Climate Change for the Asia Pacific region. Prior to that, he worked at The World Bank for nearly 25 years on a range of development issues, managing its programmes in Viet Nam, Turkey, Macedonia, Indonesia and the Pacific. He also worked in the research department on public finance and public economics. Chhibber was the lead author of the seminal work on Governance at the World Bank and the 1997 World Development Report on the Role of the State. Chhibber has also worked at the Planning Commission (India) and at the International Food Policy Research Institute. He has also taught economics at Georgetown University and the University of Delhi. Currently, he serves as a visiting scholar at the George Washington University's Institute for International Economic Policy

Chhibber has published widely, including five books on economic development and many articles in international journals and in major newspapers.
