= Anand Burman =

Indian businessman (born 1952)

- Born: Anand Ashok Chand Burman; 1952 (age 73–74); Kolkata, India
- Education: St. Paul's School, Darjeeling; University of Wisconsin (BS, MS); University of Kansas (PhD)
- Occupation: Businessman
- Title: Chairman, Dabur
- Spouse: Minnie Burman
- Children: 2

Anand Ashok Chand Burman (born 1952) is an Indian billionaire businessman, and chairman of Dabur a leading consumer goods company. With a net worth of $5.8 billion, he is among the 20 richest Indians and on the Forbes list.

== Early life ==
Burman was born in Kolkata in 1952, in a Bengali Hindu business family. His father was Ashok Chand Burman, chairman emeritus of Dabur. He finished his initial school education at St. Paul's School in Darjeeling, India. Burman completed his bachelor's degree in chemistry from the University of Wisconsin and his master's degree and a doctorate in pharmaceutical chemistry, both from the University of Kansas.

== Dabur ==
Anand joined the family business Dabur as manager of the research and development department in 1980. He came on the company's board in 1986 and became chairman in 2007.

== Other associations ==
Anand is the co-founder of an Asian healthcare fund and is on the board of directors for 33 companies including Hero Motocorp, Aviva Life Insurance, Ester Industries, and Interx Laboratories. He has been the chairman of Fresenius Kabi Oncology Ltd and an independent non-executive director of Hindustan Motors Ltd. Anand started a non-profit organisation, Sundesh, working for healthcare and education.

== Awards and recognitions ==
- One of 14 finalists from India in EY Entrepreneur of the Year 2011
- Camden FB Top 50 family business leaders 2013
- Business Leader of the Year Award at The Asian Awards, 2019

== Personal life ==
Anand Burman is married to Minnie Burman, and they have two children, son Aditya, and daughter Anisha.
