= Samiran Nundy =

Indian surgeon

Dr. Samiran Nundy Padma Shri
- Born: India
- Education: University of Cambridge
- Occupations: President of AIIMS, Rishikesh & Consultant, Sir GangaRam Hospital, New Delhi
- Known for: Gastroenterology; Social activism
- Children: Karuna Nundy
- Awards: Padma Shri (1985)

Samiran Nundy is an Indian gastrointestinal surgeon, medical academic, writer and the President of All India Institute of Medical Sciences, Rishikesh. He is a former member of the faculty at the Cambridge University, London University and Harvard University, and is the founder editor of the National Medical Journal of India and Tropical Gastroenterology. The Government of India awarded him the fourth-highest Indian civilian honour of Padma Shri in 1985.

== Biography ==
Nundy did his undergraduate studies in medicine at Cambridge University and the Guy's Hospital, London after which he completed his residency at the Hammersmith Hospital. This was followed by a series of surgical training programmes at Guy's Hospital, Addenbrooke's Hospital, Hammersmith Hospital and Massachusetts General Hospital, Boston.

During his stay abroad, he had teaching stints at Cambridge University, London University and Harvard University. Returning to India in 1975, he joined the All India Institute of Medical Sciences, Delhi as a member of the faculty and stayed there until his superannuation in 1996. During his tenure there, he helped found the Department of Gastrointestinal Surgery and Liver Transplantation at AIIMS, of which he was the founder professor.

In 1996, he joined Sir Ganga Ram Hospital, Delhi where he is the Emeritus Consultant of the Department of Surgical Gastroenterology and Liver Transplantation. He led the team which is credited with 241 liver sections during the period 1996-2005, the details of which were published in a medical paper, Two hundred and forty-one consecutive liver resections: an experience from India.

Nundy is the founder editor of the National Medical Journal of India and Tropical Gastroenterology, and the incumbent editor-in-chief of Current Medicine Research and Practice. He is the co-chairman of the department of academics at the Sir Ganga Ram Hospital. He is also associated with the Indian Journal of Medical Ethics as its editor, and Edpulseline.com as a member of its advisory board. He is a fellow of the Royal College of Surgeons of Edinburgh and the Royal College of Physicians of Edinburgh. His research findings have been documented by way of several articles and medical papers of which ResearchGate has listed 190, while Google Scholar has listed 320.

Nandy serves as a member of the advisory board of Medicounsel, a medical advisory organization composed of noted medical specialists, engaged in providing guidance to patients inflicted with rare and complicated diseases. He is also a part of the team of 290 specialists of DoctorNDTV. Com, an online consultation forum, functioning under the aegis of the NDTV network. The website is reported to have a monthly average of 400 million views and, 3600 queries. His contributions are also reported behind the Transplantation of Human Organs Act 1994, which made human organ trading illegal and recognised brain death as a form of death in India.

The Government of India awarded him the civilian honour of Padma Shri in 1985.

== Social activism ==
In May 2014, Nundy wrote an editorial in the Journal of Current Medicine Research and Practice in which he exposed the corrupt practices in the Indian health sector. He mentioned the practice of unnecessary investigations and referrals made by the doctors and their practice of accepting commissions for the referrals. He suggested computerisation of medical records and procedure audits to combat this trend. His editorial was inspired by the article, "Corruption ruins the doctor-patient relationship in India", published in the British Medical Journal and written by David Berger, an Australian physician who had worked as a volunteer at a charitable hospital in India. The article and the subsequent editorial made news among the medical fraternity and have drawn concurring responses from the government.
