= Preem =

Swedish petroleum and renewable fuels company

VAROPreem Sverige AB
- Trade name: Preem
- Formerly: OK Petroleum AB; Preem Petroleum AB; Preem AB
- Type: Subsidiary
- Industry: Petroleum, renewable fuels
- Founded: July 14, 1960; 66 years ago
- Headquarters: Stockholm, Sweden
- Area served: Sweden, Norway
- Products: Fuels, renewable fuels, heating oil, lubricants
- Revenue: SEK 130.8 billion (2024)
- Operating income: SEK 2.15 billion (2024)
- Net income: SEK 1.52 billion (2024)
- Number of employees: 1,823 (2024)
- Parent: VAROPreem
- Website: www.preem.se

Preem, legally known as VAROPreem Sverige AB, is a Swedish petroleum and renewable fuels company headquartered in Stockholm. It operates two major refineries, Preemraff Lysekil and Preemraff Gothenburg, along with a nationwide fuel distribution network and approximately 500 filling stations in Sweden. Its products include petroleum-based and renewable fuels, heating oil and lubricants, supplied to domestic and international markets.

The company was established in 1960 and adopted the Preem name in 1996, having previously operated as OK Petroleum. In January 2026, it was acquired by VARO Energy and became part of the newly formed VAROPreem group. The company was subsequently renamed VAROPreem Sverige AB in February 2026, while the Preem name was retained for its Swedish filling station network.

== History ==
=== Origins and establishment ===
The company's legal history dates to 1960. Its modern operations developed from the Swedish petroleum businesses that were later consolidated into OK Petroleum. One of its principal facilities, the refinery near Lysekil, began operations in 1975 as a joint venture between the Swedish oil cooperative OK and the American oil company Texaco.

In 1986, OK Petroleum AB was formed through the merger of the industrial operations of OK with the state-owned Svenska Petroleum AB. The company operated refineries at Lysekil and Gothenburg, together with a nationwide fuel distribution network. Under the original ownership agreement, OK was allocated a 53% stake, the Swedish government 30%, and the Finnish state-owned oil company Neste 17%.

In 1987, Kooperativa Förbundet (KF) assumed responsibility for OK's ownership interest. By 1994, KF held 52% of OK Petroleum, while the Swedish government and Neste each held 24%.

In March 1994, OK Petroleum was acquired by Corral Petroleum Holdings, controlled by Ethiopian-Saudi businessman Mohammed al-Amoudi. The company adopted the name Preem Petroleum AB in 1996, when its retail operations were consolidated under the Preem brand, replacing the Texaco and OK identities at approximately 500 filling stations.

=== Refinery expansion and renewable fuels ===
The Preemraff Lysekil refinery at night

In December 2003, Preem acquired Norsk Hydro's remaining 25% interest in the Scanraff refinery at Lysekil, gaining full ownership of the facility. The transaction followed approval by the European Commission.

On 20 October 2008, Preem Petroleum AB shortened its corporate name to Preem AB, reflecting its increasing emphasis on transport fuels and the development of renewable alternatives to conventional petroleum products.

Preem subsequently expanded its investments in renewable fuels. In 2008, it invested in SunPine, a Swedish producer of renewable feedstock derived from forestry residues. In 2010, the company began producing renewable diesel through the co-processing of renewable raw materials at its Gothenburg refinery. It introduced Preem Evolution Diesel in 2011 and expanded renewable diesel production capacity at Gothenburg in 2015.

In September 2020, Preem cancelled plans to construct a residue oil conversion complex at its Lysekil refinery. The project, which had faced environmental scrutiny, was abandoned after the company determined that changing economic conditions had undermined its commercial viability. Preem instead announced plans to prioritise investments in renewable fuel production.

Preem also pursued plans to gradually convert its refineries into biorefineries, shifting production from fossil-based fuels towards renewable fuels. While the Gothenburg refinery was already producing renewable diesel, a large-scale conversion project at Lysekil began in October 2020.

On 16 June 2025, Preem inaugurated its upgraded Synsat facility at Lysekil, increasing its annual renewable fuel production capacity by approximately 900,000 cubic metres. The investment enabled large-scale diesel production using up to 40% renewable feedstock.

=== Acquisition by VARO Energy ===
On 31 March 2025, Swiss-based VARO Energy announced an agreement to acquire Preem through the purchase of its parent company, Corral Petroleum Holdings AB. The transaction followed a strategic review of Corral's assets that had begun in late 2023.

Following regulatory approval, VARO completed the acquisition on 16 January 2026, combining the businesses under the newly established VAROPreem group. The combined company brought together Preem's Swedish refineries and distribution infrastructure with VARO's refining, trading and renewable energy operations across Europe.

On 9 February 2026, Preem AB was legally renamed VAROPreem Sverige AB, continuing as part of the VAROPreem group. The Preem name was retained for the company's Swedish filling station network, while its refining and other industrial operations became part of the group's wider business.

== Operations ==
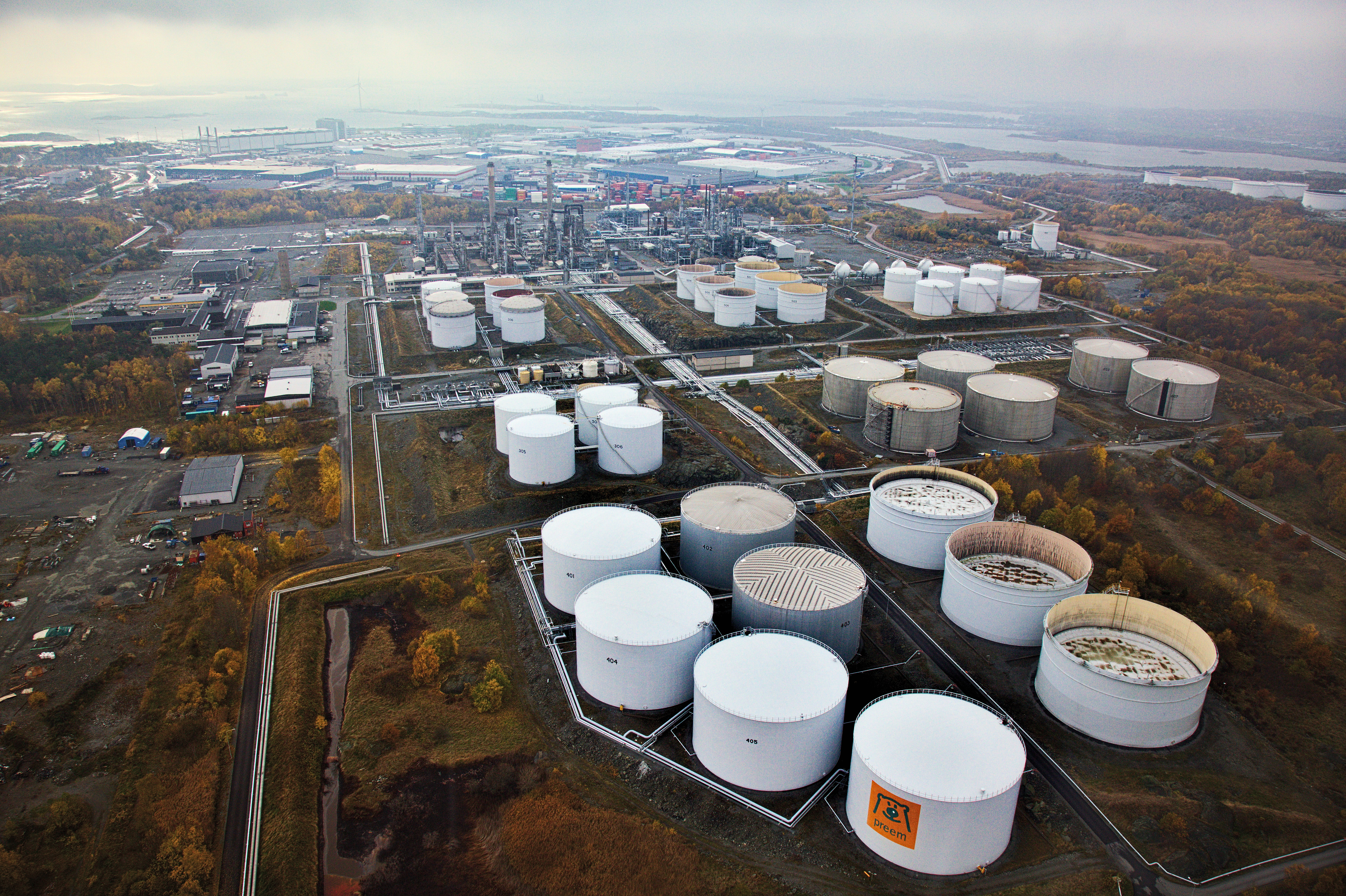
Aerial view of the Preemraff Gothenburg refinery

Preem operates two major refineries in Sweden, at Lysekil and Gothenburg, with a combined refining capacity of approximately 352,000 barrels per day, accounting for around 80% of the country's total refining capacity. The company produces petrol, diesel, renewable fuels, heating oil and other petroleum products, supplying approximately half of the fuel consumed in Sweden.

Approximately two-thirds of Preem's production is exported, primarily to markets in Northwestern Europe. In Sweden, its products are distributed through the company's filling station network, resellers and direct sales to commercial customers. In Norway, sales are conducted primarily through resellers and direct bulk deliveries to businesses.

In 2024, Preem reported net sales of SEK 130.8 billion, an operating profit of SEK 2.15 billion and a net profit of SEK 1.52 billion. The group employed an average of 1,823 people during the year.

=== Retail network ===
Preem operates approximately 500 filling stations throughout Sweden. The network includes staffed service stations with convenience stores, unmanned automatic stations and facilities serving heavy commercial vehicles. It also offers renewable fuels and electric vehicle charging at selected locations. Following the 2026 acquisition, the network remained under the Preem brand as part of VAROPreem's retail operations.

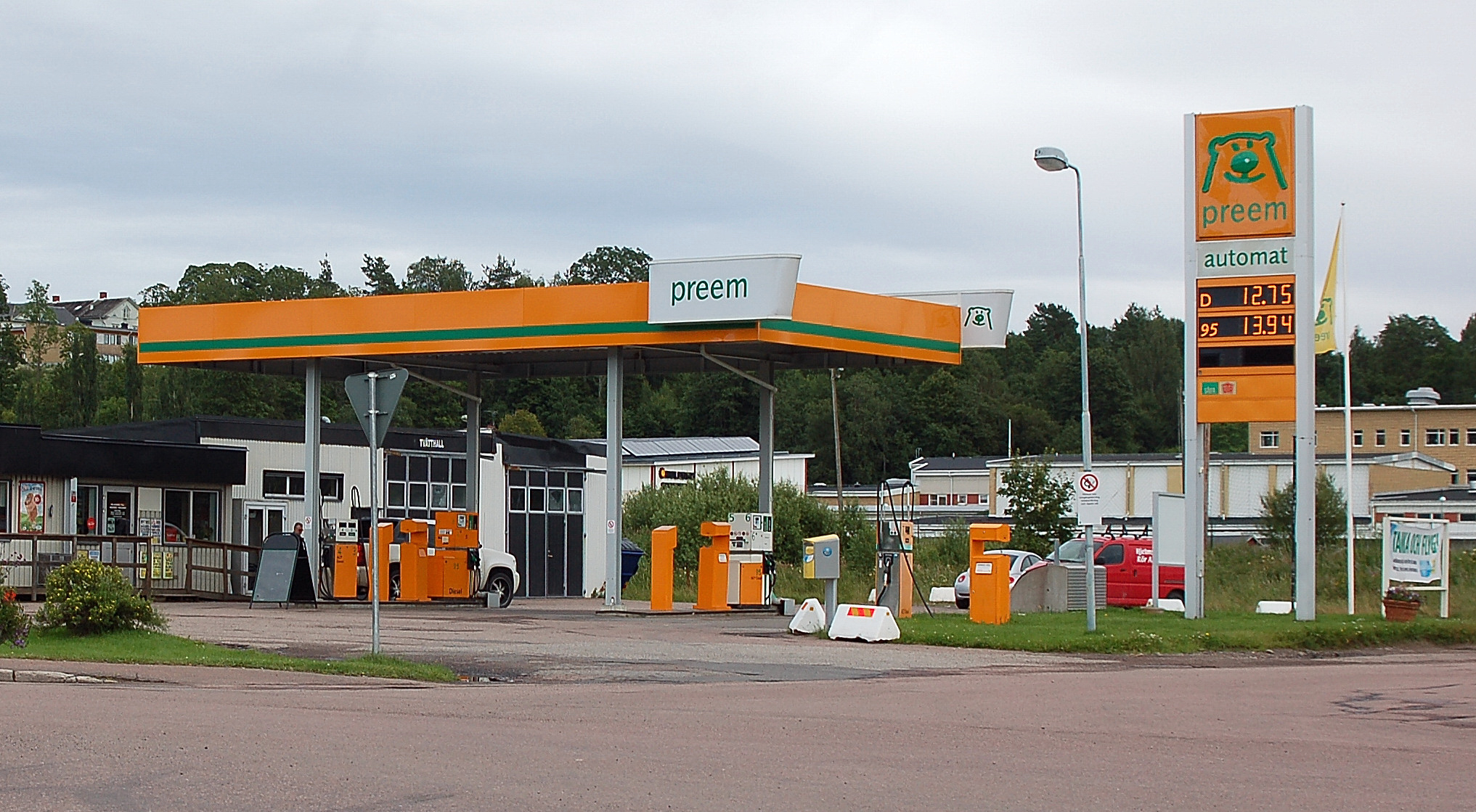
Preem automated fuel station in Molkom, Sweden, in 2015.

== Environmental impact ==
Preem's refining operations have historically been among Sweden's major industrial sources of carbon dioxide emissions. The company reported approximately 2.1 million tonnes of direct carbon dioxide emissions in 2017, declining to approximately 1.7 million tonnes in 2019.

In May 2020, Preem and Aker Solutions began testing carbon capture and storage technology at the Lysekil refinery. The pilot project, undertaken in collaboration with Chalmers University of Technology, Equinor and SINTEF, examined the feasibility of capturing carbon dioxide from refinery operations and transporting it for permanent geological storage.

In 2024, Preem was Sweden's second-largest industrial emitter of carbon dioxide, releasing approximately 1.94 million tonnes from its refineries in Lysekil and Gothenburg. The Lysekil refinery alone emitted approximately 1.38 million tonnes of fossil carbon dioxide in 2024, making it one of Sweden's largest individual industrial emission sources.

== See also ==
- VAROPreem
- Preemraff Gothenburg
- Preemraff Lysekil
