= Karuna Nundy =

Lawyer at the Supreme Court of India

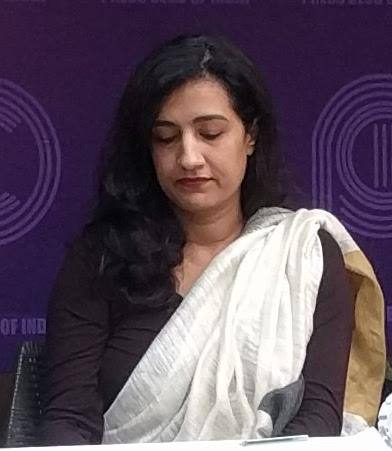
- Karuna Nundy in 2024
- Born: April 28, 1976 (age 50); India
- Education: BA (Hons) in Economics, St. Stephen's College, Delhi University; LL.B., Cambridge University; LL.M., Columbia University, New York
- Occupations: Senior Advocate, Lawyer
- Years active: 2005–present
- Notable work: Paytm vs. Telecom Companies case; Jeeja Ghosh vs. SpiceJet; Shreya Singhal vs. Union of India
- Title: Senior Advocate, Supreme Court of India
- Father: Samiran Nundy

Karuna Nundy is an Indian lawyer and Senior Advocate at the Supreme Court of India, designated as a Senior Advocate in 2024. She is qualified to practice in both India and New York. Her notable cases include enforcing blockchain regulations on behalf of Paytm against telecom companies, securing damages for a disability rights activist against SpiceJet, and addressing issues related to platform liability and online speech restrictions. She has also worked on efforts to provide safe water to Bhopal gas disaster victims. Her practice areas include constitutional law, commercial litigation, arbitration, intellectual property, technology law, and international law. She also serves as a mediator at the Supreme Court Mediation Centre.

== Early life and education ==
Karuna Nundy was born on 28 April 1976 in India to Dr. Samiran Nundy and Sushmita Nundy. Her father is a gastrointestinal surgeon, medical academic, writer, and President of AIIMS Rishikesh, and a recipient of the Padma Shri in 1985. Her mother was the founder and chair of the Spastics Society of India.

Her father transitioned from Harvard Medical School to AIIMS and a public hospital in India, and her mother, with a background from the London School of Economics and SOAS University, founded the Spastics Society of Northern India after learning about a family member’s cerebral palsy.

Nundy holds a BA (Hons) in Economics from St. Stephen's College, Delhi University. She studied law at Cambridge University, where she served as Editor-in-Chief of the Cambridge University Law Society Journal. She later earned an LL.M. from Columbia Law School, New York, and was awarded a Human Rights Fellowship.

== Career ==
Nundy is qualified to practice in India and New York. She opted to forgo a long-term position at Clifford Chance and instead pursued short-term employment at the associate level in India. This decision allowed her to gain experience in investment treaty arbitration, including working on the case of Telenor v. the Republic of Hungary, a Bilateral Investment Treaty (BIT) claim brought by a Norwegian investor company.

Arbitration Experience

Nundy's arbitration experience includes cases such as Telecommunications Consultants India Ltd. v. PPCL Ltd. (representing a Government of India public sector undertaking in a dispute over an Algerian contract) and Jayaswals Neco Pvt. Ltd. v. Trimex FZE and Jayaswals Neco Pvt. Ltd. v. GNDC, Hong Kong, (both related to disputes over coke supply contracts). While at Essex Court Chambers, she provided research assistance to Sir Christopher Greenwood QC (later a judge at the International Court of Justice) for the case of Occidental v. Republic of Ecuador before the UK High Court, which arose from a bilateral investment treaty between the United States and Ecuador.

Paytm petition to implement the TCCPR Rules and TRAI Act

Nundy represented Paytm, which sought enforcement of the Telecom Commercial Communications Customer Preference Regulations, 2018, and Telecom Regulatory Authority of India Act, 1997, to prevent unsolicited communications that defrauded and spammed consumers. Nundy argued that the right to informational privacy under Articles 21 and 19 of the Indian Constitution encompasses protection from spam and fraud caused by unsolicited commercial communications.

1984 gas disaster and toxic waste dumps in Bhopal

Nundy has been a vocal advocate for the families and victims of the 1984 Bhopal Gas tragedy. She represents survivor groups, NGOs, and other entities seeking compensation from Union Carbide, criminal prosecution of those responsible for the disaster, prevention of further harm from the toxic waste sites, and enforcement of the survivors’ rights before the Supreme Court of India. Notably, her legal efforts led to the closure of contaminated water outlets near the Union Carbide factory, which posed a health risk to survivors and residents.

Marital Rape

Nundy has represented women's rights organisations in petitions advocating for the criminalisation of marital rape in India. These petitions seek the removal of the marital rape exception from the Indian Penal Code. A landmark petition was filed in 2015 by the NGO RIT Foundation, followed by others in 2017, including one by the All India Democratic Women’s Association, which Nundy represented. In arguments before the Delhi High Court in 2022, Nundy challenged the constitutionality of the marital rape exception. The High Court issued a split verdict, and the case is currently pending before the Supreme Court, where Nundy continues to advocate for legal equality for married and unmarried women.

Legalisation of Queer Marriage

Nundy represented two couples and one queer rights activist seeking legal recognition of queer marriage before the Delhi High Court. One petition that challenges the Special Marriage Act, Foreign Marriage Act, and Citizenship Act is on behalf of an overseas citizen of India (OCI) and a US citizen seeking OCI status as a marital partner. The third petitioner is Mario D’Penha, who is a queer rights activist and academic pursuing a PhD at Rutgers University.

Criminal Law Amendments 2013 (Anti-rape Bill)

Following the 2012 Delhi gang rape, Nundy was invited by the Justice JS Verma Committee to submit expert recommendations for amendments to criminal law. Her contributions informed the drafting of the anti-rape bill that later became the Criminal (Amendment) Act, 2013. This act amended various provisions of the Indian Penal Code, the Indian Evidence Act, and the Criminal Procedure Code. The drafting inputs and work with the government provided recommendations for quicker trial and enhanced punishment for criminals accused of committing sexual assault against women. The Act amended several provisions of the Indian Penal Code, the Indian Evidence Act, and the Criminal Procedure Code.

National Food Security Act, 2013 (Right to Food Act)

Nundy also served on the National Advisory Council (Law Drafting Committee) for the Right to Food Act. In recognition of the fundamental right to food, the Act provides subsidised food grains to approximately two-thirds of the country's 1.2 billion people.

Shreya Singhal v. Union of India

Nundy appeared on behalf of the People’s Union for Civil Liberties (PUCL), an NGO that defends civil liberties and human rights in India, in the landmark Supreme Court judgment, which struck down section 66A of the Information Technology Act, 2000. The case deals with freedom of speech and online censorship.

Jeeja Ghosh & Anr. v. Union of India & Ors.

In 2016, Nundy represented Jeeja Ghosh, a passenger with cerebral palsy, in a case against SpiceJet Airlines. Ghosh was denied boarding on a flight from Kolkata to Goa due to concerns about her health expressed by airline staff. Nundy argued for equal treatment of disabled passengers in air travel. The Supreme Court ruled in favor of Ms. Ghosh, awarding her compensation of ₹10 lakh and directing all air carriers to provide training for their staff on the needs and proper treatment of passengers with disabilities.

Covid-19 continuing mandamus before the Delhi HC

During the peak of the second wave of COVID-19 in India, Nundy represented the Aseemit Social Foundation before the Delhi High Court. The NGO sought judicial intervention to ensure the provision of essential supplies and medical care for COVID-19 patients undergoing home treatment due to a shortage of hospital beds. Nundy's arguments focused on the need for effective measures, including a functioning GNCTD helpline and website, telemedicine availability, and a system for tracking and managing the limited oxygen supply. She also advocated for providing COVID-19 kits containing necessary treatment supplies to those unable to afford separate housing and medical care, along with ensuring access to food.

MC Mehta v. Union of India (sealing case)

In a Supreme Court case concerning the sealing of residential properties, Nundy represented homeowners facing property sealing and potential demolition. The Supreme Court ultimately sided with Nundy's argument and ruled in favour of the homeowners.

Sexual Harassment and Assault case against Manik Katyal

Nundy represented close to 30 defendants, from young women photographers in India, Korea, Cambodia and elsewhere who complained against the photo editor and curator Manik Katyal for harassment and sexual assault.

Advisory Work on Gender Equality and anti-sexual harassment

Nundy has advised several companies on equality policies and the prevention of sexual harassment policies. She has also worked with companies such as ITC Vivel and Penguin Random House to create education modules that simplify laws to empower women. One such video that she co-created was with ITC Vivel as part of their Know Your Rights campaign, receiving 6 million views.

== International Law ==
Nundy is a member of the New York State Bar Association (2005 to present), the New York State Bar Association Committee on Alternative Dispute Resolution (2005-2017), the London Court of International Arbitration, and the Young International Arbitration Group (2006- 2017).

Nundy worked as a lawyer with the United Nations as a Global Advocacy Officer, assisting the secretary-general’s report on conflict prevention. She advised the Maldives Supreme Court and Attorney General’s Office in 2009-2010. She held widespread consultations to determine recommendations to implement the new constitution, especially for legal empowerment and access to justice for children and women. She advised the Interim Government of Nepal on drafting the Constitution with UNICEF Nepal Country Office in August 2006 and advised on and drafted contributions to the Fundamental Rights section of the Nepal Interim Constitution.

Nundy’s advisory work also includes a legislative workshop on constitutional rights with the Senate of Pakistan, advice to the Government of Bhutan with UNICEF Bhutan Country Office (Sept 2006) on the fulfilment of its treaty obligations regarding certain international human rights conventions, and advising SAARC countries on progress in legal reform and policy since 2001, pursuant to several SAARC and international conventions and its impact on the Millennium Development Goals. In 2007, she created a template for South Asian governments to cost and budget for child protection interventions with the UNDP Regional Centre in Colombo, UNICEF Regional Office South Asia.

In 2019, Nundy was appointed to the High Level Panel of Legal Experts on Media Freedom, chaired by Lord Neuberger and Amal Clooney. The Panel is the independent advisory arm to Media Freedom Coalition of States. Nundy also serves as an expert on the Columbia Global Freedom of Expression Committee.

Nundy has trained judges globally at a MOOC of the Bonavero Institute at Oxford University on international standards required of judges when dealing with 'blasphemy' and religious hate speech—especially when journalists are implicated.

== Public engagement ==
Nundy is an advocate for gender equality and reform, particularly concerning sexual harassment and rape laws. She has been a vocal critic of workplace sexual harassment and has advised companies on preventing and addressing such issues. Nundy's experience extends to representing clients in court cases related to sexual harassment. Her work on India's anti-rape legislation, including the 2013 Criminal Law (Amendment) Act, has been significant. She continues to advocate for further legal reforms, including the criminalisation of marital rape.

== Publications ==
Nundy has published a chapter on ‘Arbitration of Claims Relating to Environmental Damage in India’ in the Wolters Kluwer book Arbitration in India, edited by Dushyant Dave, Martin Hunter, Fali Nariman, and Marike Paulsson. She recently authored A Report on Blasphemy Laws Globally, on behalf of the High Level Panel on Media Freedom, published by the International Bar Association Human Rights Institute and the High Level Panel on Media Freedom (through the International Bar Association with UNESCO).

Nundy’s publications with UN agencies include a paper titled “You Hate Me? Now Go to Jail: When ‘Hate’ is Criminal,” published in ‘Intellectual, Philosophers, Women in India: Endangered Species, Women Philosophers Journal’. She was the lead researcher for Columbia Global Freedom of Expression’s Research Project on Violence Against Journalists, published by Columbia University’s Global Freedom of Expression. Nundy also authored the Global Status of Legislative Reform Related to the Convention on the Rights of the Child for the Global Policy Section, UNICEF, New York in 2004.

She has also written opinion pieces on legal issues for publications such as the New York Times, CNN, the Indian Express, Hindustan Times, and the Hindu.
