= Air BP =

Aviation division of BP

- Type: Division
- Industry: Petroleum
- Headquarters: U.K.
- Area served: Worldwide
- Products: Aviation fuel, lubricants
- Owner: BP
- Website: bp.com/air-bp

Air BP is the specialised aviation division of BP. Air BP services are available at over 600 airport locations in 55 countries, and serves airlines, commercial aviation and general aviation.

Air BP is one of the world's largest suppliers of both aviation fuels, including AVGAS and kerosene jet fuels, and lubricants for both turbine and piston-engined aircraft. Air BP currently supplies around 8 billion US gallons (30,000,000 m^{3}) annually of both aviation fuels and lubricants to their worldwide customers.

== Alternative propulsion ==
On 13 November 2007, Air BP launched a plug-in hybrid refueling vehicle at the Dubai Airshow.

== US military fuel contracts ==
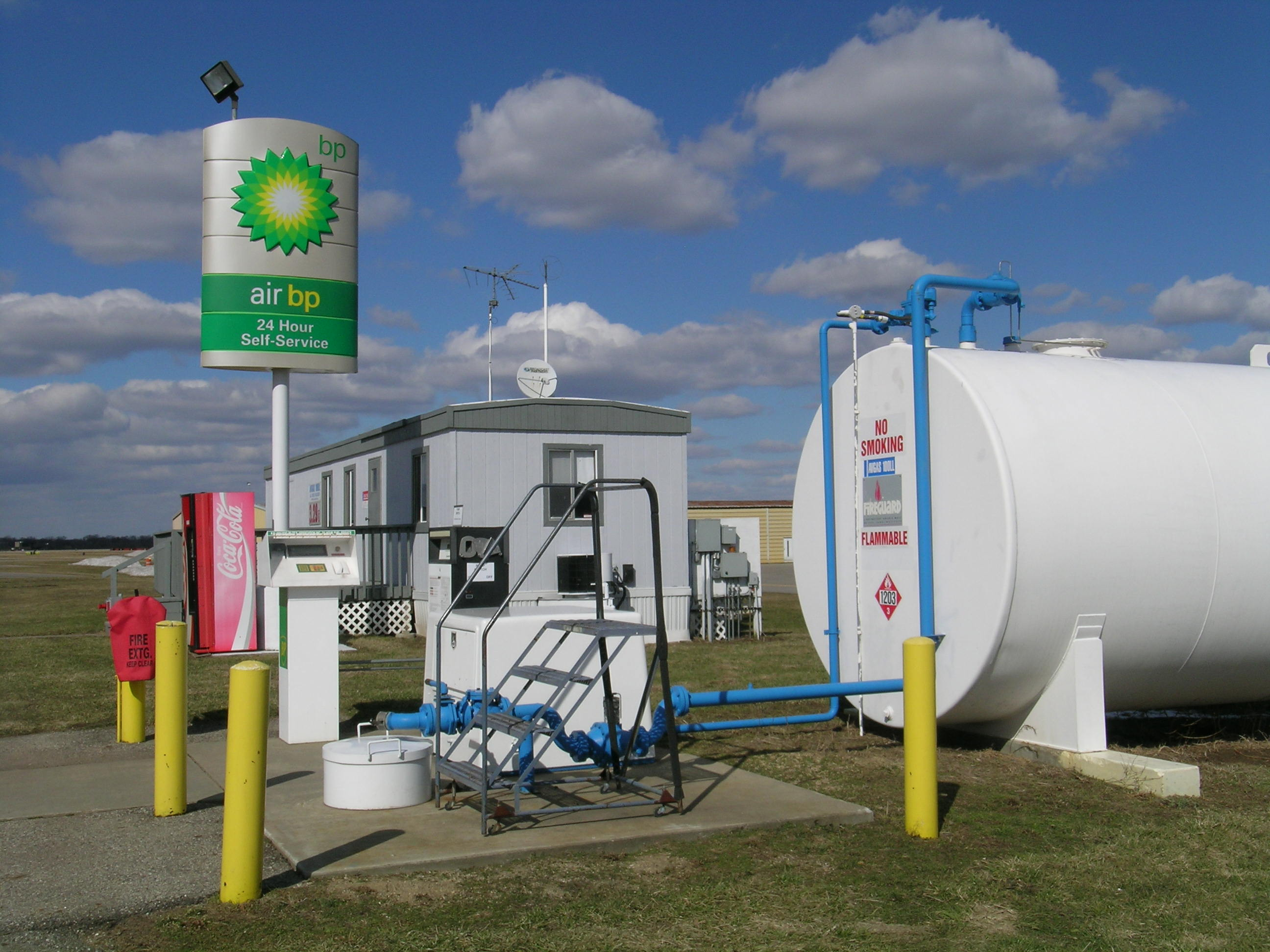
A self-service Air BP fueling station at the Kalamazoo/Battle Creek International Airport

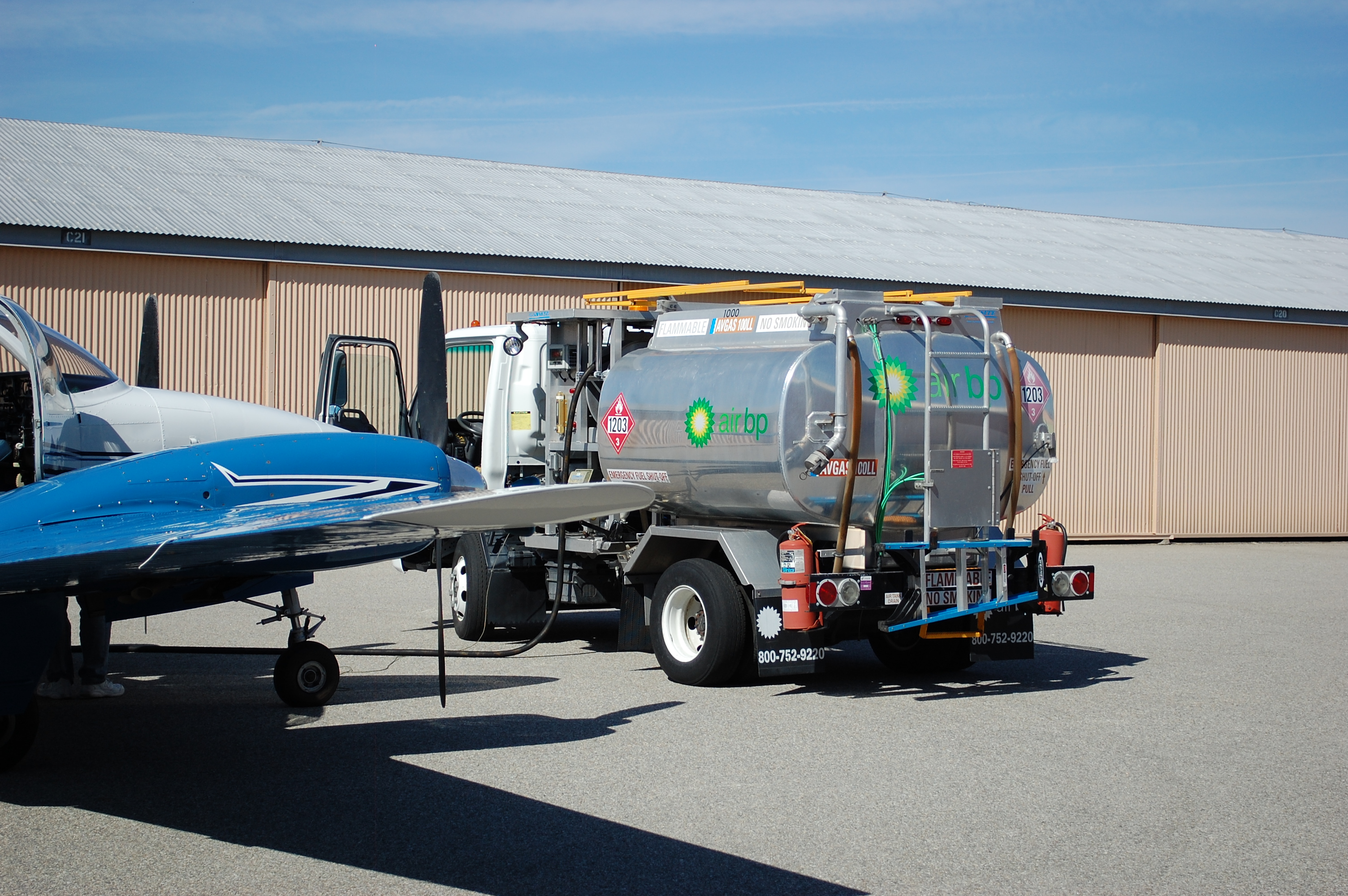
A typical Air BP fuel truck fills a Beechcraft Baron

April 6, 2010 -- "Air BP, Warrenville, Ill. is being awarded a maximum $124,754,182 fixed-price with economic price adjustment, indefinite-delivery/indefinite-quantity contract for aviation turbine fuel."

16-Aug-2009 -- "BP West Coast Products (dba Arco) in La Palma, CA won a maximum $516.8 million fixed price with economic price adjustment, indefinite-delivery/ indefinite-quantity contract (SP0600-09-D-0512) for aviation fuel."

August 24, 2008 -- "Air BP, Warrenville, Ill. is being awarded a maximum $12,446,821 fixed price with economic price adjustment contract for jet fuel."

September 14, 2005 -- "BP West Coast Products LLC, La Palma, Calif., is being awarded a maximum $587,804,938 fixed price with economic price adjustment for JP8 Turbine Fuel and F-76 Fuel for Defense Energy Support Center."
