= Preemraff Gothenburg =

Oil refinery in Gothenburg, Sweden

Coordinates: 57.7085°N 11.8330°E

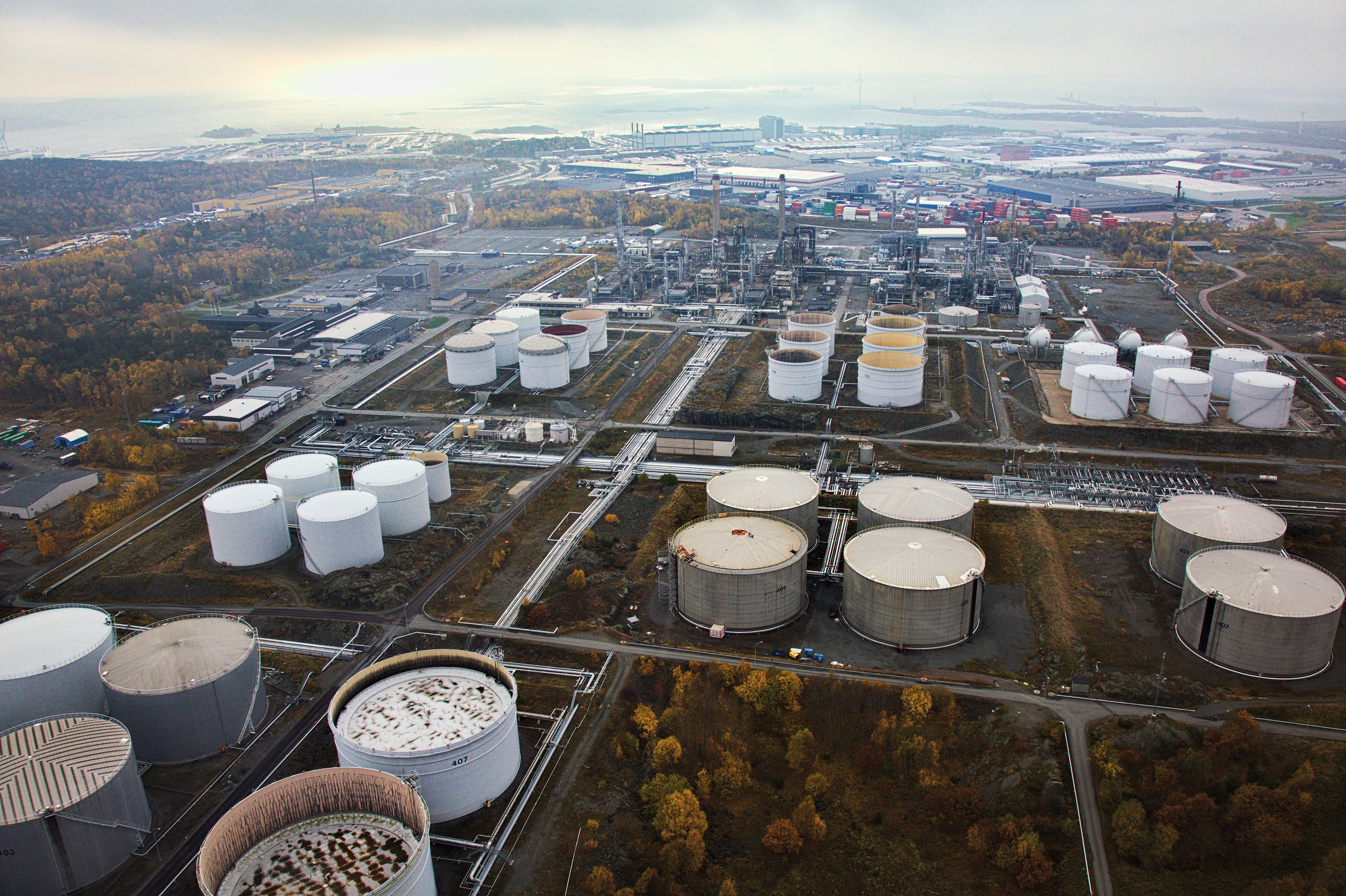
Aerial photo of Preemraff in Gothenburg 2013

Preemraff Göteborg is an oil refinery in the Swedish city of Gothenburg. Preem is the largest supplier of petroleum products in Sweden and its two refineries, Preemraff Göteborg in Gothenburg and Preemraff Lysekil in Lysekil represent 80% of Sweden's refining capacity. The Gothenburg refinery is certified according to ISO 14001. The facility produces liquefied petroleum gas, gasoline, diesel and heating oil for both the Swedish and foreign markets.

Construction started in 1965 and refining started in 1967. Originally owned by BP, it was sold to OK Petroleum when BP decided to leave the Swedish market in 1991. In 1994, Sheik Mohammed Al Amoudi from Saudi Arabia bought OK Petroleum, and in 1996 changed the name to Preem Raffinaderi.

The port for crude oil tankers (allowing 19 metres (62 ft) draft) is around 6 km (3.7 mi) west, from where there is a pipeline connection. Refined products are shipped from a port near the Preemraff, or by road or rail connection.

== See also ==
- Port of Gothenburg
- Preemraff Lysekil
