= Preemraff Lysekil =

Oil refinery in Sweden

Coordinates: 58°20′53″N 11°25′00″E

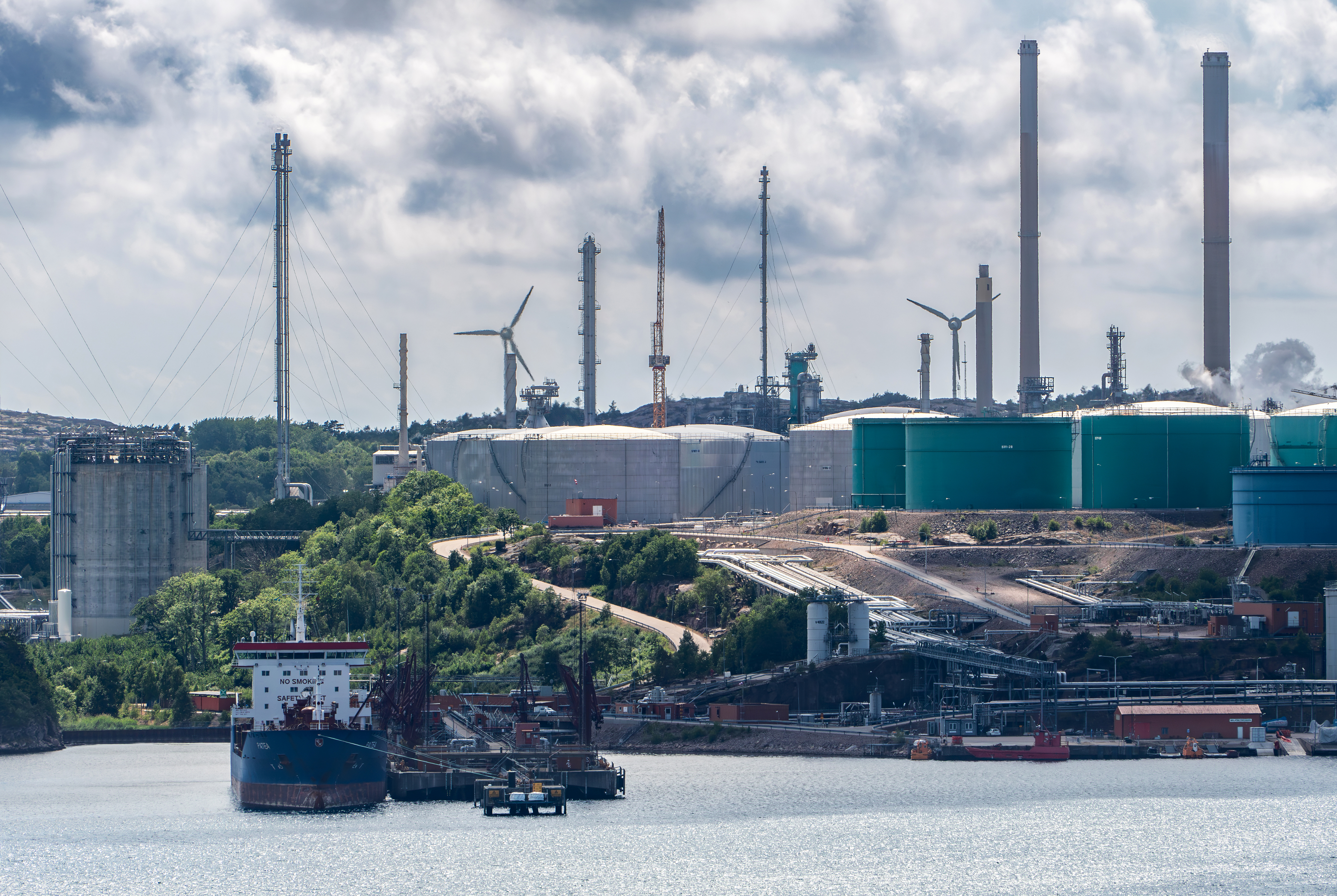
Preemraff Lysekil's product terminal

Preemraff Lysekil is an oil refinery located at Brofjorden near the Swedish city of Lysekil.

== Production ==
Originally named Scanraff, the refinery was taken into use in 1975. The site was selected because of its excellent natural harbour, and the facility can accept supertankers up to 500,000 tonnes deadweight (DWT). In 2003, the facility was acquired by Preem. Refined products are mainly transported from Preemraff Lysekil using tanker ships. There is no rail connection and the road connections are poor.

Preem is the largest supplier of petroleum products in Sweden and its two refineries, Preemraff Göteborg in Gothenburg, and Preemraff Lysekil in Lysekil represent 80 percent of Sweden's refining capacity. The annual capacity of Preemraff Lysekil is around 11 million metric tons of crude oil.

The highly visible flares, towers and chimneys also makes the refinery a navigation mark for vessels entering Brofjorden. The two highest chimneys are 165 m (541 ft) tall.

== See also ==
- Preemraff Göteborg

== Panorama ==
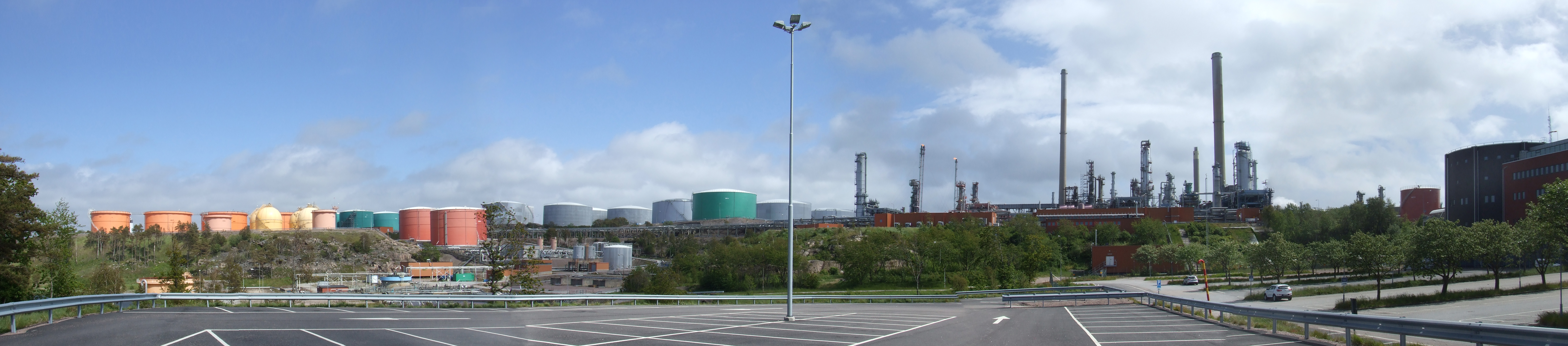
