= Subroto Roy (economist) =

Indian economist

Subroto Roy is an Indian economist, formerly an economic policy advisor to Rajiv Gandhi (1990–91), contributing editor to The Statesman and faculty member at UH-Manoa and IIT Kharagpur.

== Biography ==
He graduated from St. Paul's School, Darjeeling in 1971. He then went to Haileybury College, Hertford, England completing GCE Advanced and Special Levels in physics, chemistry and biology in 1973. Subsequently, he entered the London School of Economics, and graduated with a first class honours degree in the BScEcon specialising in mathematical economics, econometrics, monetary economics and international economics in 1976.

In 1982, he was awarded the PhD in the Faculty of Economics of the University of Cambridge, where Professor Frank Hahn had been supervisor. Professor CJ Bliss of Oxford University and Professor Terence W Hutchison of Birmingham University were the Examiners of the doctoral thesis "On liberty and economic growth: preface to a philosophy for India".

He served as an economic advisor to former Indian prime minister Rajiv Gandhi.

== Career ==
He has taught economics and/or finance at several Cambridge colleges, the Delhi School of Economics, Virginia Tech, Cornell University, Brigham Young University, UH-Manoa, IIT Kharagpur, University of Buckingham. He has been a consultant at the World Bank and the IMF in Washington, and worked briefly on Wall Street.

== Publications ==
India's Money 2012

Margaret Thatcher's Revolution: How It Happened and What It Meant 2006

Foundations of Pakistan's Political Economy 1993

Foundations of India's political economy: Towards an agenda for the 1990s 1992

The Philosophy of Economics: On the Scope of Reason in Economic Inquiry 1991

Pricing, Planning & Politics: A Study of Economic Distortions in India 1984
