= The National Medical Journal of India =

- Discipline: Medicine
- Language: English
- Edited by: Peush Sahni

Publication details
- History: 1988–present
- Publisher: All India Institute of Medical Sciences, New Delhi (India)
- Frequency: Bimonthly
- Open access: Yes
- Impact factor: 0.595 (2011)

Standard abbreviations
- ISO 4: Natl. Med. J. India

Indexing
- ISSN: 0970-258X
- OCLC no.: 609713856

Links
- Journal homepage; Online access; Online archive

The National Medical Journal of India is a bimonthly peer-reviewed medical journal that was established in 1988. It is published by the All India Institute of Medical Sciences, New Delhi. It is abstracted and indexed in Index Medicus (Medline), Current Contents/Clinical Medicine, Excerpta Medica, BIOSIS Previews, and the Science Citation Index. According to the Journal Citation Reports, the journal has a 2011 impact factor of 0.595.

Article types include Editorials, Original Articles, Review Articles, Selected Summaries, Letters from Chennai, Mumbai, London, and Glasgow, Clinical Case Reports, Book Reviews, Clinico-pathological Conferences, Everyday Practice, Masala, and News from Here and There.

The founding editor-in-chief was Samiran Nundy (1988–1996). Later editors have been K.S. Reddy (1997–2003) and Peush Sahni (2004–present).
