= McSporran =

McSporran is a surname. Notable people with the surname include:

- Jermaine McSporran (born 1977) British semi-professional footballer
- Seamus McSporran (born 1938), Scottish man who worked in 14 jobs for 31 years in the Scottish island of Gigha.
- Willie McSporran, former chair of the Hebridean Isle of Gigha's Heritage Trust.
