= Kilchattan Chapel =

Ruined chapel near Ardminish, Scotland

Coordinates: 55.6690°N 5.7494°W

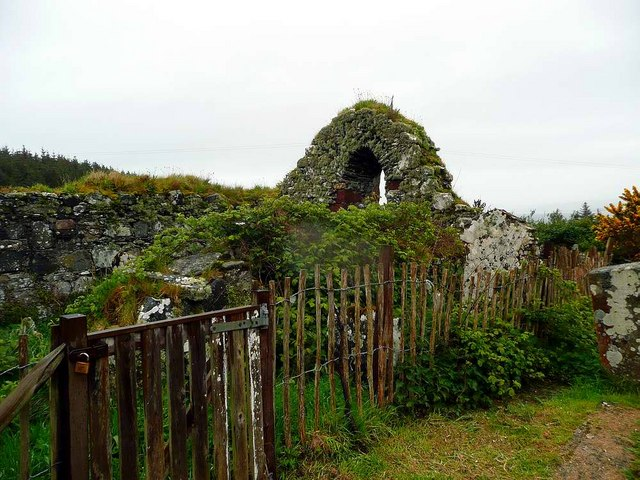
Ruins of Kilchattan Chapel

Kilchattan Chapel (St Cathan's Chapel) is a ruined medieval chapel near Ardminish, Isle of Gigha, Argyll and Bute, Scotland. Built in the 13th century, the chapel was dedicated to St. Cathan.
