= Cathan =

Irish monk and saint of the 6th century

Saint Cathan
- Born: Unknown
- Died: Unknown
- Venerated in: Scottish Episcopal Church Roman Catholic Church Eastern Orthodox Church
- Feast: 17 May

Saint Cathan, also known as Catan, Cattan, etc., was a 6th-century Irish monk revered as a saint in parts of the Scottish Hebrides.

== Source material ==
This saint appears in the Aberdeen Breviary, Walter Bower's Scotichronicon, and the Acta Sanctorum. A number of placenames in western Scotland are associated with him.

== Gaelic Christianity ==
He is said to have been one of the first Irish missionaries to come to the Isle of Bute, then part of the Gaelic Kingdom of Dál Riata.

Very little is known of him; he is generally mentioned only in connection with his more famous nephew Saint Blane, who was born on Bute and later proselytized among the Picts. Both saints were strongly associated with Bute and with Kingarth monastery, which became the center of their cults.

A number of churches were dedicated to Cathan across Scotland's western islands.

- Tobar Chattan, or Cathan's Well, at Little Kilchattan on Bute may represent the site of Cathan's original church.
- Other churches, now in ruins, include St Cathan's Chapel on Colonsay,
- Kilchattan Chapel on Gigha, and
- Kilchattan Church on Luing. The Luing church served the historical Kilchattan parish; the modern Kilchattan Church was built at Achafolla in 1936.

Cathan is said to have lived for a time at the monastery at Stornoway on the isle of Lewis, and his relics are said to have been housed at a chapel founded by Clan MacLeod on the same island.

== Impact ==
=== Landscape ===
Cathan's name survives in the various toponyms in the area containing the element Chattan (where the first consonant is lenited), such as:

- many places called Kilchattan ("Church of Cathan")
- Ardchattan ("Cathan's Heights")
- the village of Kilchattan Bay
- Little and Mickle Kilchattan farms
- names of the hill of Suidhe Chattan
- Suidhe Chatain Hill in Bute.

all on Bute.

=== Feast day ===
His feast day is 17 May.

=== Later Highland clan development ===
Several families on Bute bore the honoured name of Mac-gill-chattan—son of the servant of Catan and on account of the frequent occurrence of names similarly connected with those of saints who had churches dedicated to them in this vicinity e.g., Mac-gill-munn, Macgill-chiaran, Mac-gill-mhichell,—and connected with church offices, Mac-gill-espy (bishop), Mac-gill-Christ etc.

Cattanachs are said to be families that followed or were originally servants or Coarbs of this saint and include founder families such as MacBean, MacPherson, and MacPhail of the Chattan Confederation, a coalition of Scottish clans.
