= Gigalum Island =

Island in Argyll and Bute, Scotland

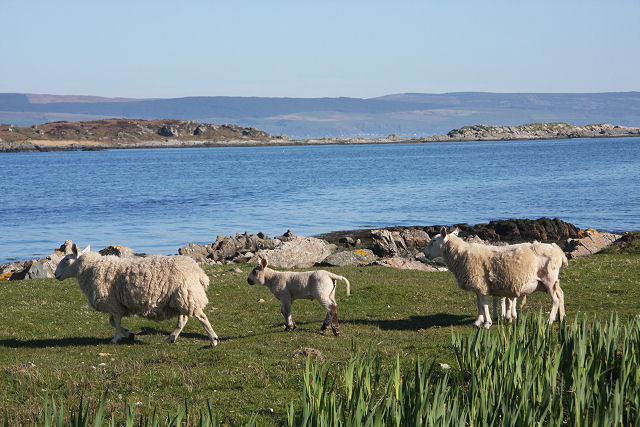
- Gigalum Island seen from Gigha

Location
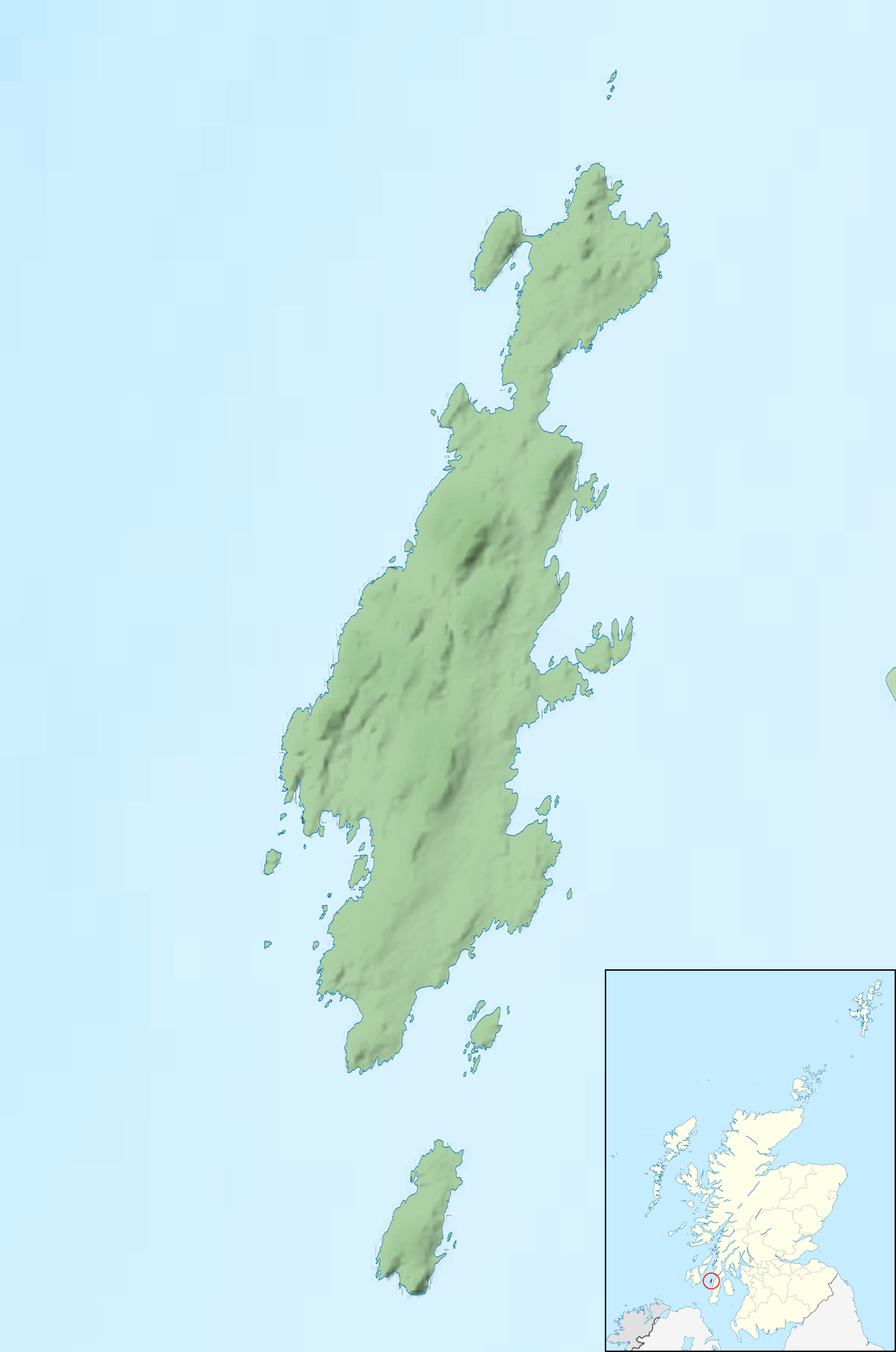
- Gigalum Island shown next to Higha Gigalum Island shown within Argyll and Bute
- OS grid reference: NR6470145940
- Coordinates: 55.649529°N 5.7416546°W

Administration
- Council area: Argyll and Bute
- Country: Scotland
- Sovereign state: United Kingdom

Demographics
- Population: 0

Gigalum Island or Gigalum is a tiny, private uninhabited island off the southeast coast of Gigha in Scotland.

Gigalum has a medieval house in the middle, and gives its name to the strait between it and the main island, "Caolas Gigalum". There is also the "Gigalum Rocks" a reef to the east, and about one mile (1.5 kilometres) north-northeast of Gigalum Island itself, "Sgeir Gigalum". It is also flanked by another islet, "Eilean na h-Uilinn", literally "Island of the Elbow".
