= Giolla Críost Brúilingeach =

Giolla Críost Brúilingeach (fl. 1440) was a noted Scottish harp player and poet. He was mentioned in the Book of the Dean of Lismore, which possibly identifies him as being from the Leim shore area of the Isle of Gigha, and with the MacBhreatnaigh (Galbraiths) family of that island.

His poetry includes Scottish and Irish subjects, including one to Conochobar Óg MacDiarmada of Moylurg (1458), a chief in Connacht, requesting a new harp as a fee.
