= Seumas McSporran =

Scottish multiple worker (1938–2026)

- Born: James Alexander Graham McSporran; 9 January 1938; Gigha, Scotland
- Died: 15 February 2026 (aged 88); Ardrishaig

James Alexander Graham McSporran, BEM (9 January 1938 – 15 February 2026), better known as Seumas, was a Scottish man who worked 14 jobs for 31 years on the Scottish Isle of Gigha.

== Life and work ==
Seumas McSporran was born on Gigha, on 9 January 1938. His family were Gaelic speakers. He worked several jobs, namely as an ambulance, bus and taxi driver (using the same vehicle), school-bus driver, boatman, accountant, guesthouse proprietor (including renting bicycles to tourists), firefighter unit leader, assurance agent, petrol pump attendant, pier master, police officer, sub-postmaster, registrar of births, marriages and deaths, rent collector, shopkeeper, undertaker, barman, delivery driver of beer to the island's local pub.

He undertook National Service at the age of 18 as a storeman in the Royal Air Force, returning to Gigha on completion. He began working in 1965 as postmaster and shopkeeper, and gradually increased his responsibilities. Mainland employers for jobs on the island often required possession of a phone and, with the post office the sole location with one at the time, McSporran was uniquely placed as a candidate. He lost his job as postman in 1975. By 1985 he had ceased to have jobs as shipping company representative or coastguard. In 1989 he received the British Empire Medal for his services. McSporran announced his retirement to Ardrishaig, on the mainland, in April 2000 at the age of 62. His various roles were taken over by Viv and Andy Oliver.

In an interview he said that his wife Margaret (née Lindsay) had been a great help with his multiple duties. They never took a holiday and worked from 6am to 10pm. He was a spokesman for the islanders in 1989 when Gigha was sold and again in 1992 when repossessed by a Swiss Bank. His brother is Willie McSporran, instrumental in the community buy-out of Gigha in 2001. In 2011 BBC Radio nan Gàidheal made a two-part series of the brothers making a trip around their home island.

A Guinness Book of Records entry listed him as having the world's largest number of jobs. He was required to make a separate tax return for each of his eight paid jobs.

McSporran was featured in the widely-used English textbooks for adults New Headway Elementary and New Headway Elementary 3rd Edition.

He appeared on BBC's Nationwide in 1976, focussing on the reporter repeatedly encountering the same man, responsible for various jobs in the crew's visit to Gigha. The character of Gordon Urquhart, a hotelier, accountant, barman and taxi driver played by Denis Lawson, in Bill Forsyth's 1983 feature Local Hero is believed to be partly based on McSporran. His experience as postmaster was featured on the British Postal Museum and Archive's audio CD, Speeding the Mail.

McSporran died at home in Ardrishaig on 15 February 2026, at the age of 88.
