= Tayinloan =

Coordinates: 55°39′26″N 5°39′53″W

Tayinloan: Scottish Gaelic: Taigh an Lòin
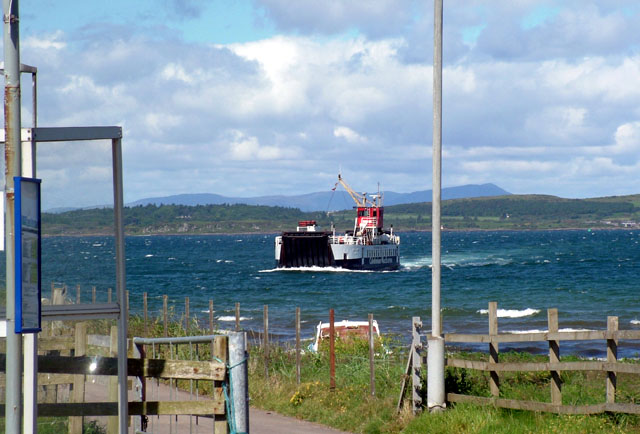
- The Gigha ferry coming in to land at Tayinloan

- Location within Argyll and Bute
- OS grid reference: NR695458
- Council area: Argyll and Bute
- Lieutenancy area: Argyll and Bute
- Country: Scotland
- Sovereign state: United Kingdom
- Post town: TARBERT
- Postcode district: PA29
- Police: Scotland
- Fire: Scottish
- Ambulance: Scottish
- UK Parliament: Argyll, Bute and South Lochaber
- Scottish Parliament: Argyll and Bute

Tayinloan (Scottish Gaelic: Taigh an Lòin, pronounced [t̪ɤj ə ˈl̪ˠɔːɲ]) is a village situated on the west coast of the Kintyre peninsula in Argyll and Bute, Scotland. The village has a sub post office, general store and a small hotel, (both continuing operations after being closed for what the owners call "indefinite", referring to the opening of both facilities) a village hall and a play park. There is a cafe bar situated beside the ferry car park which also offers self-catering or bed and breakfast accommodation. The nearest towns are Campbeltown (19 miles or 31 kilometres south) and Tarbert (20 miles or 32 kilometres north).

A ferry service runs between the village and Ardminish on the Isle of Gigha. The A83 road runs through the village, as does a long-distance footpath, the Kintyre Way, a walk of some 106 mi (171 km), stretching between Tarbert, Loch Fyne and Southend at the Mull of Kintyre.

Killean House near Tayinloan was built in the 1880s by John James Burnet for James Macalister Hall, after the original house burnt down.

Largie Castle is a former mansion house at Tayinloan. The house was designed by the architect Charles Wilson for the Hon. Augustus Moreton Macdonald and was built in 1857–9. The house was demolished in 1958.
