= Willie McSporran =

British community activist

Willie McSporran MBE is the former chair of the Hebridean Isle of Gigha's Heritage Trust. In 2002 the trust raised £4 million for the purchase of the island, which is now managed by its population of 110.

His brother is Seamus McSporran. In 2011 BBC Radio nan Gàidheal made a two-part series of the brothers making a trip around their home island.
