= Ardminish =

Village on the Isle of Gigha, Scotland

Coordinates: 55.66°N 5.75°W

Ardminish: Scottish Gaelic: Aird Mhèanais
- Location within Argyll and Bute
- Council area: Argyll and Bute
- Lieutenancy area: Argyll and Bute
- Country: Scotland
- Sovereign state: United Kingdom
- Post town: ISLE OF GIGHA
- Postcode district: PA41
- Dialling code: 01583
- Police: Scotland
- Fire: Scottish
- Ambulance: Scottish
- UK Parliament: Argyll, Bute and South Lochaber
- Scottish Parliament: Argyll and Bute

Ardminish (Scottish Gaelic: Aird Mhèanais) is the sole village on the Isle of Gigha in the Inner Hebrides, in Argyll and Bute, Scotland, and considered its "capital". It is connected to the mainland through a regular ferry service that runs to Tayinloan. In 1961 it had a population of 84.

Ardminish has the pier, post office and shop.

The name Ardminish means "The headland of the narrow point", from a mixture of Gaelic and Norse.

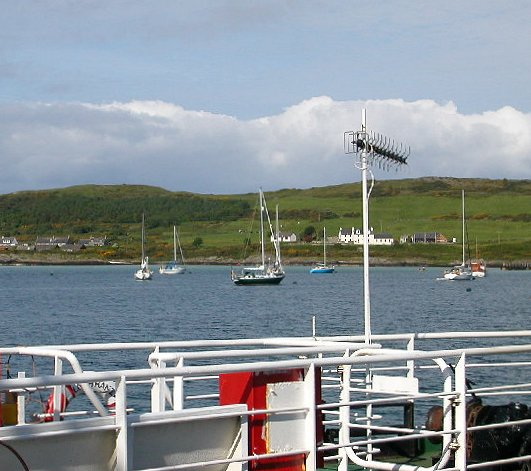
Ardminish Bay, from the Gigha ferry

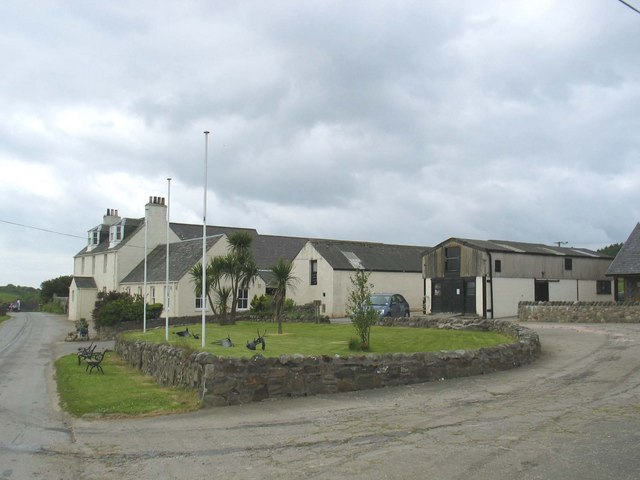
The Gigha Hotel, Ardminish
